= Patiram =

Patiram Patirampur, Jahangirpur
- Village
- Location in West Bengal, India Patiram (India)
- Coordinates: 25°19′N 88°45′E
- Country: India
- State: West Bengal
- District: Dakshin Dinajpur

Languages
  - Official: Bengali, English
- Time zone: UTC+5:30 (IST)
- PIN: 733133
- Telephone code: 03522
- Vehicle registration: WB
- Nearest city: Balurghat
- Lok Sabha constituency: Balurghat
- Vidhan Sabha constituency: Tapan
- Climate: Moderate, Comfortable (Köppen)

Patiram is a village in Balurghat CD Block of Balurghat subdivision in Dakshin Dinajpur district in the state of West Bengal in India. Patiram is situated beside of Atreyee River. It is 11 km away from the district headquarters Balurghat.

== Geography ==
Cities and towns in the Dakshin Dinajpur district
M: municipal city/ town, CT: census town, R: rural/ urban centre, H: historical site
Owing to space constraints in the small map, the actual locations in a larger map may vary slightly

=== Location ===
Patiram is located at 25°19′N 88°45′E.

In the map alongside, all places marked on the map are linked in the full screen version.

== Education ==
Jamini Majumdar Memorial College was established at Patiram in 2008. Affiliated with the University of Gour Banga, it offers honours courses in Bengali, English, Sanskrit, history and political science and a general course in arts.

There are two Higher Secondary Schools and a college in this town. Patiram High School is near Taltala More; Patiram Vivekananda Girls' High School. Other schools are:

- Patiram High School
- Patiram Vivekananda Uccha Balika Vidyalaya
- Bahicha L.K. High School(Par- Patiram)
- Patiram Primary School
- Patiram Nichabandar Primary School
- Patiram Girls Primary School.
- Patiram Sahapara Primary School
- Patiram Kadamtali Primary School.
- Patiram Barshapara Primary School
- Patiram Laxmipur Primary School
- Patiram Ananda Margi
- Patiram Monteswary Academi
- Patiram Hindu Milon Mondir

There is a library named Monorama Palli Pathagar

== Economy ==
There is a vegetable market popularly called Patiram Bazar which is quite big and one nearby Taltala More.

There is one taxi stand in this town at chowrangi more. Milan mandir(Bharat Sevashram Sangha) is in this town. There is a Government Veterinary Hospital at this village.

There are 5 banks in this town. These are State bank of India, Bangiya gramin Vikash Bank, Bandhan Bank, Muthoot Finance and Co-operative Bank. Three ATM two of State bank of India and one Axis Bank ATM are available at this town.

== Cultures ==
The main festivals of Patiram are Durga Puja, Eid and Christmas Day. Nicha Bandar Durga Puja, Arabinda Palli Durga Puja, Pronab Palli Durga Puja, Sahapara Durgapuja and Kadam tali Durga Puja are popular. Kali Puja and Viswakarma Puja are also celebrated here. There are so many Pallis and Paras at this village. These are Nicha bandar, Dakshin Para(Master Para), kadam Tali, Saha para, kachhari Para, Arabinda Palii, Pranab Palli, Dak banglo Para, echamati, pirojpur, baram, etc.

== Festivals ==
Durga Puja, Kali Puja, Saraswati puja and Biswakarma Puja, Shiv Ratri and Eid are celebrated at Patiram.

Patiram Bidyeshwari Kali Mandir is an old and famous temple. Every day, pilgrims worship goddess Bidyeshwari as goddess Kali. Par Patiram Shiv Mandir is famous and many people visit it at Shivaratri. Patiram Hindu Milan Mandir is known for its cultural activity.

== Transportation ==
Patiram is well connected to district town Balurghat. It is a center point of Hili, Kumarganj, Balurghat and Gangarampur. It is connected to Siliguri and Kolkata by bus and train. Mahinagar airport is only 10 km away. Nearby Railway station is Mallikpur Railway Station at Baul village at 4 to 5 km distance.

== See also ==
Baidul
