= Tapan =

Tapan may refer to:

== Places ==
- Tapan, Azerbaijan, a village and municipality in Azerbaijan
- Tapan, Dakshin Dinajpur, a village in West Bengal, India
- Tapan, Homalin, Burma
- Tapan (Community development block), an administrative sub-district in West Bengal, India
- Tapan (Vidhan Sabha constituency), an assembly constituency in Dakshin Dinajpur district in the Indian state of West Bengal
- Geghasar, Armenia, formerly known as Tapan
- Ayuu-Tapan, a village in Osh Region of Kyrgyzstan

== People ==
A male given name from Sanskrit meaning shining.

- Tapan Acharya (born 1981), Indian actor, writer, producer and director in Marathi and Konkani Cinema
- Tapan Banerjee (1943–2017), Indian cricketer
- Tapan Barua (????-2014), Indian cricketer
- Tapan Bhattacharya (born 1949), Indian cricketer
- Tapan Chowdhury, Bangladeshi businessman
- Tapan Chowdhury, Bangladeshi musician and former member of the musical band Souls
- Tapan Das, Indian actor, director and story teller in Assamese cinema and theatre
- Tapan Deb Singha, Indian politician from West Bengal, member of the West Bengal Legislative Assembly
- Tapan Kumar Pradhan, Indian poet, writer and activist
- Tapan Kumar Sarkar, Indian-American electrical engineer
- Tapan Kumar Sen, Indian politician
- Tapan Mahmud, Bangladeshi Rabindra Sangeet singer
- Tapan Maity (born 1984), Indian football player
- Tapan Misra, Indian scientist, director of Space Applications Centre, Indian Space Research Organisation
- Tapan Mitra (1948–2019), Indian-born American economist
- Tapan Raychaudhuri (1926-2014), Indian historian
- Tapan Sikdar (1944–2014), Indian politician and government minister
- Tapan Sinha (1924-2009), Indian film director
- Tapan Sharma (born 1975), Indian cricket umpire

== Others ==
- Tapan (drum), or davul, a drum used in Balkan and Turkish music

== See also ==
- Tapani (disambiguation)
