= Balurghat subdivision =

- Subdivision
- Coordinates: 25.22°N 88.76°E
- Country: India
- State: West Bengal
- District: South Dinajpur
- Headquarters: Balurghat

Government
  - SDM: Subrata Kumar Barman, WBCS
  - DSP: Bikram Prasad, WBPS; Billa Mangal Saha, WBPS; Pradeep Sarkar, WBPS; Rahul Barman, WBPS; Sanjib Biswas, WBPS

Area
  - Total: 1,202.88 km^{2} (464.43 sq mi)

Population
  - Total: 985,500
  - Density: 819.3/km^{2} (2,122/sq mi)

Languages
  - Official: Bengali, English
- Time zone: UTC+5:30 (IST)
- ISO 3166 code: ISO 3166-2:IN
- Vehicle registration: WB

Balurghat subdivision is an administrative subdivision of the Dakshin Dinajpur district in the Indian state of West Bengal.

== Subdivisions ==
Dakshin Dinajpur district is divided into two administrative subdivisions:

Subdivision	Headquarters	Area km^{2}2001	Population (2011)	Urban population % (2011)	Rural Population % (2011)
Balurghat	Balurghat	1,202.88	905,540	18.56	81.44
Gangarampur	Buniadpur	1,047.90	770,736	8.86	91.14
Dakshin Dinajpur district	Balurghat	2,219.00*	1,676,276	14.10	85.90

.*2011

== Administrative units ==
Balurghat subdivision has 4 police stations, 4 community development blocks, 4 panchayat samitis, 35 gram panchayats, 888 mouzas, 852 inhabited villages, 1 municipality, 3 census towns and 1 outgrowth. The only municipality is at Balurghat. The census towns are Patiram, Dakra and Chak Bhrigu. The outgrowth is Baidyanathpara. The subdivision has its headquarters at Balurghat.

== Police stations ==
Police stations in Balurghat subdivision have the following features and jurisdiction:

Police station	Area covered (km^{2})	Border (km)	Population	Municipal town/ city	CD Block
Balurghat	n/a	n/a	401,934	Balurghat	Balurghat
Balurghat Women	-	-	-	-	Balurghat subdivision
Hili	n/a	n/a	83,700	-	Hili
Kumarganj	n/a	n/a	160,120	-	Kumarganj
Tapan	n/a	n/a	248,305	-	Tapan

== Blocks ==
Community development blocks in Balurghat subdivision are:

CD Block	Headquarters	Area km^{2}	Population (2011)	SC %	ST %	Hindus %	Muslims %	Literacy rate %	Census Towns
Balurghat	Balurghat	369.39	250,764	29.40	26.41	92.34	5.18	73.96	3
Hili	Hili	90.78	83,754	25.71	18.26	88.27	9.63	76.04	-
Kumarganj	Kumarganj	286.62	169,102	25.93	17.01	64.89	32.66	74.57	-
Tapan	Tapan	445.63	250,764	32.32	22.34	70.34	27.31	68.62	-

== Gram panchayats ==
The subdivision contains 35 gram panchayats under 4 community development blocks:

- Hili block consists of 5 gram panchayats, viz. Binshira, Hili, Panjul, Dhalpara and Jamalpur.
- Balurghat block consists of 11 gram panchayats, viz. Amritakhand, Chakvrigu, Gopalbati, Patiram, Bolla, Chingishpur, Jalghar, Vatpara, Boaldar, Danga and Najirpur.
- Kumarganj block consists of 8 gram panchayats, viz. Batun, Deor, Mohana, Safanagar, Bhour, Jakirpur, Ramkrisnapur and Samjia.
- Tapan block consists of 11 gram panchayats, viz. Ajmatpur, Gophanagar, Hazratpur, Rampara Chenchra, Autina, Gurail, Malancha, Tapanchandipur, Dwip Khanda, Harsura and Ramchandrapur.

== Education ==
Dakshin Dinajpur district had a literacy rate of 72.82% (for population of 7 years and above) as per the census of India 2011. Balurghat subdivision had a literacy rate of 75.78%, Gangarampur subdivision 69.24%.

Given in the table below (data in numbers) is a comprehensive picture of the education scenario in Dakshin district for the year 2013-14:

Subdivision	Primary School		Middle School		High School		Higher Secondary School		General College, Univ		Technical / Professional Instt		Non-formal Education	
Subdivision	Institution	Student	Institution	Student	Institution	Student	Institution	Student	Institution	Student	Institution	Student	Institution	Student
Balurghat	671	46,548	42	4,482	52	74,677	55	68,352	4	6,930	4	385	2,304	55,876
Gangarampur	505	51,355	56	5,078	33	82,967	51	69,003	3	7,100	1	100	1,457	51,230
Dakshin Dinajpur district	1,176	97,903	98	9,560	85	157,644	106	137,655	7	14,030	5	485	3,761	107,106

Note: Primary schools include junior basic schools; middle schools, high schools and higher secondary schools include madrasahs; technical schools include junior technical schools, junior government polytechnics, industrial technical institutes, industrial training centres, nursing training institutes etc.; technical and professional colleges include engineering colleges, medical colleges, para-medical institutes, management colleges, teachers training and nursing training colleges, law colleges, art colleges, music colleges etc. Special and non-formal education centres include sishu siksha kendras, madhyamik siksha kendras, centres of Rabindra mukta vidyalaya, recognised Sanskrit tols, institutions for the blind and other handicapped persons, Anganwadi centres, reformatory schools etc.

The following institutions are in Balurghat subdivision:

Balurghat College was established as an Intermediate college in 1948 at Balurghat. Degree courses were added from 1953 onwards.

Balurghat Mahila Mahavidyalaya was established in 1970 at Balurghat.

Balurghat Law College was established in 2001 at Balurghat.

Jamini Majumdar Memorial College was established at Patiram in 2008.

Nathaniyal Murmu Memorial College was established at Tapan in 2011.

S.B.S. Government College, Hili was established at Hili in 2015.

Kumarganj College was established at Kumarganj in 2016.

== Healthcare ==
The table below (all data in numbers) presents an overview of the medical facilities available and patients treated in the hospitals, health centres and sub-centres in 2014 in Dakshin Dinajpur district.

Subdivision	Health & Family Welfare Deptt, WB				Other State Govt Deptts	Local bodies	Central Govt Deptts / PSUs	NGO / Private Nursing Homes	Total	Total Number of Beds	Total Number of Doctors*	Indoor Patients	Outdoor Patients
Subdivision	Hospitals	Rural Hospitals	Block Primary Health Centres	Primary Health Centres	Other State Govt Deptts	Local bodies	Central Govt Deptts / PSUs	NGO / Private Nursing Homes	Total	Total Number of Beds	Total Number of Doctors*	Indoor Patients	Outdoor Patients
Balurghat	1	4	1	12	1	1	-	3	23	822	69	64,346	1,233,046
Gangarampur	1	3	-	6	-	-	-	6	16	465	43	49,043	898,363
Dakshin Dinajpur district	2	7	1	18	1	1	-	9	39	1,287	112	113,389	2,131,409

.* Excluding nursing homes

Medical facilities available in Balurghat subdivision are as follows:

Hospitals: (Name, location, beds)
Balurghat General Hospital (District Hospital), Balurghat, 320 beds
Balurghat Police Hospital, Balurghat, 50 beds
Balurghat Poura Hospital and Matri Sadan, Balurghat, 32 beds
Rural Hospitals: (Name, block, location, beds)
Hili Rural Hospital, Hili CD Block, Hili, 25 beds
Kumarganj Rural Hospital, Kumarganj CD Block, Kumarganj, 30 beds
Tapan Rural Hospital, Tapan CD Block, Tapan, 30 beds
Khaspur Rural Hospital, Balurghat CD Block, Khaspur, 30 beds
Primary Health Centres: (CD Block-wise)(CD Block, PHC location, beds)
Kumarganj CD Block: Penitora (Samjia PHC) (10), Bathur (10), Deor (10)
Tapan CD Block: Monahali (10), Chenchra (Rampara (Chenchra) PHC) (10), Balapur (Malancha PHC) (10)
Balurghat CD Block: Bara Kasipur (Bharandah (Bolader) PHC) (10), Bolla (10), Nazirpur (10), Chak Bhrigu (Dakra PHC) (10), Kamarpara (10)
Hili CD Block: Tear (Binsira PHC) (10), Trimohini (10)

== Electoral constituencies ==
Lok Sabha (parliamentary) and Vidhan Sabha (state assembly) constituencies in Balurghat subdivision were as follows:

Lok Sabha constituency	Reservation	Vidhan Sabha constituency	Reservation	CD Block and/or Gram panchayats and/or municipal areas
Balurghat	None	Kumarganj	None	Kumarganj CD Block and Ashokegram, Basuria, Chaloon and Uday GPs of Gangarampur CD Block
		Balurghat	None	Balurghat municipality, Amritakhand, Vatpara and Chingishpur GPs of Balurghat CD Block and Hilli CD Block
		Tapan	ST	Dwipkhanda, Gophanagar, Harsura, Malancha and Tapan Chandipur GPs of Tapan CD Block, and Boaldar, Chak Vrigu, Jalghar, Bolla, Danga, Gopalbati, Najirpur and Patiram GPs of Balurghat CD Block
		Gangarampur	SC	Gangarampur municipality, Belbari I, Damdama, Gangarampur and Nandanpur GPs of Gangrampur CD Block, and Ajmatpur, Autina, Gurail, Hazratpur, Ramchandrapur and Rampara Chenchra GPs of Tapan CD Block
		Other assembly segments outside the subdivision		
