= Par Patiram =

- Census Town
- Location in West Bengal, India Par Patiram (India)
- Coordinates: 25.3346°N 88.7569°E
- Country: India
- State: West Bengal
- District: Dakshin Dinajpur

Population (2011)
  - Total: 3,225

Languages
  - Official: Bengali, English
- Time zone: UTC+5:30 (IST)
- PIN: 733133
- Telephone code: 03522
- Vehicle registration: WB
- Lok Sabha constituency: Balurghat
- Vidhan Sabha constituency: Tapan
- Website: ddinajpur.nic.in

Par Patiram is a census town in Balurghat CD Block in Balurghat subdivision of Dakshin Dinajpur district in the state of West Bengal, India.

== Geography ==
Cities and towns in the Dakshin Dinajpur district
M: municipal city/ town, CT: census town, R: rural/ urban centre, H: historical site
Owing to space constraints in the small map, the actual locations in a larger map may vary slightly

=== Location ===
Par Patiram is located at 25.3346°N 88.7569°E.

Par Patiram is located on the bank of the Atreyee.

In the map alongside, all places marked on the map are linked in the full screen version.

== Demographics ==
As per the 2011 Census of India, Par Patiram had a total population of 3,225, of which 1,607 (50%) were males and 1,618 (50%) were females. Population below 6 years was 355. The total number of literates in Par Patiram was 2,118 (73.80% of the population over 6 years).

== Transport ==
Par Patiram is on State Highway 10 (Balurghat-Hili Highway).
