= Kumarganj, Dakshin Dinajpur =

Kumarganj
- Village
- Location in West Bengal, India Kumarganj (India)
- Coordinates: 25.43379°N 88.72671°E
- Country: India
- State: West Bengal
- District: Dakshin Dinajpur

Population (2011)
  - Total: 3,920

Languages
  - Official: Bengali, English
- Time zone: UTC+5:30 (IST)
- PIN: 733141
- STD/ Telephone code: 03522
- Lok Sabha constituency: Balurghat
- Vidhan Sabha constituency: Kumarganj
- Website: ddinajpur.nic.in

Kumarganj is a village in Kumarganj CD Block in Balurghat subdivision of Dakshin Dinajpur district in the state of West Bengal, India.

== Geography ==
Cities and towns in the Dakshin Dinajpur district
M: municipal city/ town, CT: census town, R: rural/ urban centre, H: historical site
Owing to space constraints in the small map, the actual locations in a larger map may vary slightly

=== Location ===
Kumarganj is located at 25.43379°N 88.72671°E.

The Atreyee flows past Kumarganj.

In the map alongside, all places marked on the map are linked in the full screen version.

=== Police station ===
Kumarganj police station under West Bengal police has jurisdiction over Kumarganj CD Block.

=== CD Block HQ ===
The headquarters of Kumarganj CD Block is at Kumarganj.

== Demographics ==
As per the 2011 Census of India, Kumarganj had a total population of 3,920, of which 2,013 (51%) were males and 1,907 (49%) were females. Population below 6 years was 378. The total number of literates in Kumarganj was 2,642 (74.59% of the population over 6 years).

== Transport ==
The Kumarganj-Patiram Road links Kumarganj with State Highway 10.

== Education ==
Kumarganj College was established at Kumarganj in 2016. Affiliated with the University of Gour Banga it offers honours courses in Bengali, English, Sanskrit, education, history, philosophy and political science, and a general course in arts.

== Healthcare ==
Kumarganj Rural Hospital at Kumarganj (with 30 beds) is the main medical facility in Kumarganj CD Block. There are primary health centres at Penitora (Samjia PHC) (with 10 beds), Bathur (with 10 beds) and Deor (with 10 beds).
