= Majhi Khanda =

Village in West Bengal

Majhi Khanda Choumoni
- Village
- Location within West Bengal Location within India
- Coordinates: 25°18′20.91″N 88°36′21.76″E
- Country: India
- State: West Bengal
- District: Dakshin Dinajpur

Area
  - Total: 0.8475 km^{2} (0.3272 sq mi)

Population (2011)
  - Total: 694
  - Male: 359
  - Female: 335

Muslims = 80% ▲ Hindus = 20% Others (Christian, Sikh, Buddhists) = 0%

Languages
  - Official: Bengali, English
- Time zone: UTC+5:30 (IST)
- PIN: 733127
- Telephone Code: 03524
- Vehicle registration: WB
- Climate: Moderate, Comfortable (Köppen)
- Lok Sabha constituency: Balurghat
- Nearest city: Tapan
- Website: ddinajpur.nic.in

Majhi Khanda also known as Choumoni, is a small village located in Tapan subdivision of Dakshin Dinajpur district in West Bengal, India.

== Location ==
It is situated 4 km (2.5 mi) from sub-district headquarters Tapan. Balurghat is the district headquarters of this village. Dwipkhanda gram panchayat is the gram panchayat of this village. The total geographical area of the village is 84.75 hectares (209.4 acres; 0.8475 km^{2}). The village code of this village is 311512.

== Population ==
With about 164 houses, this village has a total population of 694 people amongst them are 359 male and 335 female and a total geographical area of 84.75 hectares (209.4 acres) or 0.8475 km^{2}.

== See also ==
- Tapan town in Dakshin Dinajpur.
- Dwip Khanda village in Dakshin Dinajpur.
