= Dakra =

- Census Town
- Location in West Bengal, India Dakra (India)
- Coordinates: 25.2388°N 88.7699°E
- Country: India
- State: West Bengal
- District: Dakshin Dinajpur

Population (2011)
  - Total: 5,268

Languages
  - Official: Bengali, English
- Time zone: UTC+5:30 (IST)
- Telephone code: 03522
- Vehicle registration: WB
- Lok Sabha constituency: Balurghat
- Vidhan Sabha constituency: Tapan
- Website: ddinajpur.nic.in

Dakra is a census town in Balurghat CD Block in Balurghat subdivision of Dakshin Dinajpur district in the state of West Bengal, India.

== Geography ==
Cities and towns in the Dakshin Dinajpur district
M: municipal city/ town, CT: census town, R: rural/ urban centre, H: historical site
Owing to space constraints in the small map, the actual locations in a larger map may vary slightly

=== Location ===
Dakra is located at 25.2388°N 88.7699°E.

Dakra is located across the Atreyee opposite Balurghat.

In the map alongside, all places marked on the map are linked in the full-screen version.

== Demographics ==
As per the 2011 Census of India, Dakra had a total population of 5,268, of which 2,643 (50%) were males and 2,625 (50%) were females. Population below 6 years was 407. The total number of literates in Dakra was 4,224 (86.90% of the population over 6 years).
