= Chak Bhrigu =

Chakvrigu
- Census Town
- Location in West Bengal, India Chakvrigu (India)
- Coordinates: 25.2286°N 88.7672°E
- Country: India
- State: West Bengal
- District: Dakshin Dinajpur

Population (2011)
  - Total: 6,269

Languages
  - Official: Bengali, English
- Time zone: UTC+5:30 (IST)
- Telephone code: 03522
- Vehicle registration: WB
- Lok Sabha constituency: Balurghat
- Vidhan Sabha constituency: Tapan
- Website: ddinajpur.nic.in

Chakvrigu is a census town in Balurghat CD Block in Balurghat subdivision of Dakshin Dinajpur district in the state of West Bengal, India.

== Geography ==
Cities and towns in the Dakshin Dinajpur district
M: municipal city/ town, CT: census town, R: rural/ urban centre, H: historical site
Owing to space constraints in the small map, the actual locations in a larger map may vary slightly

=== Location ===
Chak Bhrigu is located at 25.2286°N 88.7672°E.

Chak Bhrigu is located across the Atreyee opposite Balurghat. There is a bridge across the river.

In the map alongside, all places marked on the map are linked in the full screen version.

== Demographics ==
As per the 2011 Census of India, Chak Bhrigu had a total population of 6,269, of which 3,201 (51%) were males and 3,068 (49%) were females. Population below 6 years was 448. The total number of literates in Chak Bhrigu was 5,253 (90.24% of the population over 6 years).
