= National Highway 512 (India) =

National highway in India

National Highway 512
- Map of the National Highway in red

Route information
- Length: 96 km (60 mi)

Major junctions
- West end: NH 12 in Gazole, Malda district
- East end: N521 in Hili, Dakshin dinajpur district at India-Bangladesh border

Location
- Country: India
- States: West Bengal
- Primary destinations: Daulatpur, Buniadpur, Gangarampur, Balurghat

Highway system
- Roads in India; Expressways; National; State; Asian
← NH 12	→ SH 10 (West Bengal)

National Highway 512 (NH 512) is a highway in the Indian state of West Bengal. It is proposed to build four lane road. It runs from Gazole to Hili border with Bangladesh. On the other side of the border, the road continues as Hili-Birampur Highway.

Schematic map of National Highways in India

== Changeover ==
The Gazole-Hili stretch is shown both as part of State Highway 10 (West Bengal) and NH 512 in Google maps and other places. The West Bengal government, with the permission of the central government, has taken up the repair and maintenance of six major highways, which will eventually be raised to the status of a national highway. This includes the Gazole-Hili stretch.

== Route ==
Gajol - Daulatpur - Bansihari- Gangarampur - Harsura - Balurghat - Hilli (near Indo/Bangladesh Border).

== See also ==
- List of national highways in India
- National Highways Development Project
