= Tapani =

Tapani may refer to:

- Tapani (name), a Finnish male given name
- Tapani (surname), a Finnish surname
- Tapani, Iran, a village in Kermanshah Province, Iran
- Tapani Incident, an armed uprising against Japanese rule in Taiwan

== See also ==
- Tapan (disambiguation)
