= Madnahar =

- Village
- Location in West Bengal, India Madnahar (India)
- Coordinates: 25.24748°N 88.22027°E
- Country: India
- State: West Bengal
- District: Malda

Population (2011)
  - Total: 469

Languages
  - Official: Bengali, English
- Time zone: UTC+5:30 (IST)
- PIN: 732124
- STD/ Telephone code: 03512
- Lok Sabha constituency: Maldaha Uttar
- Vidhan Sabha constituency: Gazole
- Website: malda.nic.in

Madnahar is a village in Gazole CD Block in Malda Sadar subdivision of Malda district in the state of West Bengal, India.

== Geography ==
=== Location ===
Madanahar is located at 25.24748°N 88.22027°E.

== Demographics ==
As per the 2011 Census of India, Madnahar had a total population of 469, of which 239 (51%) were males and 230 (49%) were females. Population below 6 years was 61. The total number of literates in Madnahar was 322 (78.92% of the population over 6 years).

== Transport ==
Madnahar is on National Highway 512 / State Highway 10 (common route).

== Education ==
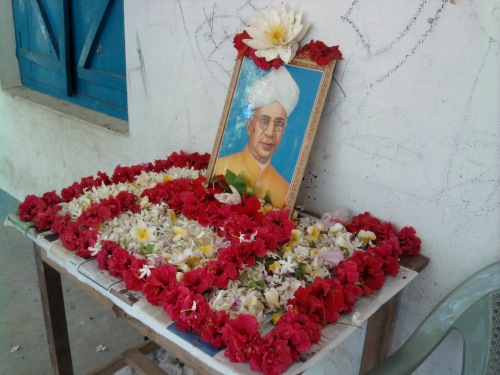
Madnahar Jr High School

Madnahar Jr. High School is situated at Madnahar village under Karkach GP. The location of the school is Madnahar Jr. High School, Vill- Madnahar, PO- Ichahar, PS+Block- Gazole, Dis- Malda, State- West Bengal. Pin-732124. The School Recognition No. is S/Recog./2009/N-688, dated 07/08/2009. The school was established in 2009. The first Academic Session has been started from August 2010 with appointment of three approved teachers Sri Mithun Basak, Sri Sumal Mistri and Basudeb Chakraborty. As the School is situated in a rural area, the number of Drop-out students is exceeding to their expectation in the first Academic Session. The total enrolment of the School is 108 in the year 2012.
