= Buniadpur Municipality =

Type
- Type: Municipality

History
- Founded: 2015; 11 years ago

Leadership
- Chairman: Akhil Chandra Barman
- Vice Chairman: Jayanta Kundu

Structure
- Seats: 14
- Political groups: AITC: 13 seats BJP: 1 seats

Elections
- Last election: 2017
- Next election: 2022

Website
- www.buniadpurmunicipality.org

Buniadpur Municipality is the civic body that governs Buniadpur and its surrounding areas in Gangarampur subdivision of Dakshin Dinajpur district, West Bengal, India.

== History ==
A municipal area for Buniadpur village was constituted with effect from 1 March 2015, as per Notification No. 98/MA/O/C-4/M-16/2011 dated 24 February 2015 of the Department of Municipal Affairs, Government of West Bengal, and published in the Kolkata Gazette dated 26 February 2015. The following mouzas were included in Buniadpur municipality: Khusipur, Sherpur, Buniadpur, Narayanpur, Selimabad, Thingur, Amai, Karkha, Shibpur, Koil, Barail, Rashidpur, Aligara, Haldi, Joydebpur, Mirjapur, Math Khidirpur, Rangapukur, Surai, Malam and Chaksadulla.

== Geography ==
Buniadpur Municipality covers an area of 24.49 sq km.

== Election ==
The first election of Buniadpur Municipality was held in 2017. Trinamool Congress won in 13 out of the 14 wards, with BJP only winning in 1 ward.
