= Balurghat (community development block) =

- Community development block
- Coordinates: 25.22°N 88.76°E
- Country: India
- State: West Bengal
- District: Dakshin Dinajpur

Area
  - Total: 363.90 km^{2} (140.50 sq mi)

Population (2011)
  - Total: 250,760
  - Density: 689.09/km^{2} (1,784.7/sq mi)

Languages
  - Official: Bengali, English
- Time zone: UTC+5:30 (IST)
- Lok Sabha constituency: Balurghat
- Vidhan Sabha constituency: Balurghat, Tapan
- Website: ddinajpur.nic.in

Balurghat is a community development block that forms an administrative division in Balurghat subdivision of Dakshin Dinajpur district in the Indian state of West Bengal.

== History ==
Dinajpur district was constituted in 1786. In 1947, the Radcliffe Line placed the Sadar and Thakurgaon subdivisions of Dinajpur district in East Pakistan. The Balurghat subdivision of Dinajpur district was reconstituted as West Dinajpur district in West Bengal. The new Raiganj subdivision was formed in 1948. In order to restore territorial links between northern and southern parts of West Bengal which had been snapped during the partition of Bengal, and on the recommendations of the States Reorganisation Commission a portion of the erstwhile Kishanganj subdivision comprising Goalpokhar, Islampur and Chopra thanas (police stations) and parts of Thakurganj thana, along with the adjacent parts of the erstwhile Gopalpur thana in Katihar subdivision were transferred from Purnea district in Bihar to West Bengal in 1956, and were formally incorporated into Raiganj subdivision in West Dinajpur. The township of Kishanganj and its entire municipal boundary remained within Bihar. With the introduction of the Community Development Programme in 1960–61, community development blocks were set up in West Dinajpur district. In 1992, West Dinajpur district was bifurcated and Dakshin Dinajpur district was established.

== Geography ==
Balurghat is located at 25°13′N 88°46′E.

Dakshin Dinajpur district is physiographically a part of the Barind Tract. The area is generally flat and slightly undulating. The elevation of the district is about 15 metres above mean sea level. However, the soil varies. CD Blocks such as Balurghat, Hili and Kumarganj have alluvial soil, Tapan CD Block has laterite soil. There are three main rivers. The Atreyee comes from Bangladesh, flows through Kumarganj and Balurghat CD Blocks and goes back to Bangladesh. The Punarbhaba flows through Gangarampur and Tapan CD Blocks. The Tangon flows through Kushmandi and Bansihari CD Blocks. There is a small river named Jamuna in the Hili CD Block. All rivers, flowing from north to south, overflow during the monsoons and cause floods.

Balurghat CD Block is bounded by Kumarganj CD Block and Birampur Upazila in Dinajpur District in Bangladesh, on the north, Hili CD Block and Joypurhat Sadar Upazila in Joypurhat District in Bangladesh, on the east, Dhamoirhat Upazila in Naogaon District in Bangladesh on the south, and Tapan CD Block on the west.

Six out of the eight CD Blocks in the district are on the India-Bangladesh border popularly referred to as a porous border. 2,216 km of the 4,096 km long India-Bangladesh border falls in West Bengal. More than 11,000 people live near/ around the zero line in Dakshin Dinajpur. Approximately 252 km of the international border is in Dakshin Dinajpur district.

Balurghat CD Block has an area of 369.39 km^{2}.It has 1 panchayat samity, 11 gram panchayats, 174 gram sansads (village councils), 309 mouzas and 294 inhabited villages. Balurghat police station serves this block. Headquarters of this CD Block is at Balurghat.

Gram panchayats of Balurghat block/ panchayat samiti are: Amritakhanda, Bhatpara, Boaldar, Bolla, Chakbhrigu, Chingishpur, Danga, Gopalbati, Jalghar and Nazirpur.

== Demographics ==
=== Population ===
As per 2011 Census of India, Balurghat CD Block had a total population of 250,764, of which 234,139 were rural and 16,625 were urban. There were 129,254 (52%) males and 121,590 (48%) females. Population below 6 years was 24,485. Scheduled Castes numbered 73,716 (29.40%) and Scheduled Tribes numbered 66,225 (26.41%).

As per 2001 census, Balurghat block has a total population of 228,701, out of which 118,056 were males and 110,645 were females. Balurghat block registered a population growth of 23.49 per cent during the 1991-2001 decade. Decadal growth for the district was 22.11 per cent.

Census towns in Balurghat CD Block were (2011 population in brackets): Par Patiram (3,225), Dakra (5,268) and Chak Bhrigu (6,269).

The only outgrowth in Balurghat CD Block was (2011 population in brackets): Baidyanathpara (1,863).

The only large village (with 4,000+ population) in Balurghat CD Block was (2011 population in brackets): Khidirpur (5,419).

Other villages in Balurghat CD Block included (2011 population in brackets): Boaldar (1,679), Bolla (2,836), Jalghar (2,310), Dangi (2,041), Bhatpara (917), Nazirpur (1,175), Gopalbati (959), Amritakhanda (2,863) and Chingispur (2,297).

Decadal growth of population in Balurghat CD Block for the period 2001-2011 was 8.82%. Decadal growth of population in Dakhin Dinajpur district during the same period was 11.52% down from 22.15% in the previous decade. Decadal growth of population in West Bengal for the corresponding periods was 13.93% and 17.77% respectively.

The large scale migration of the East Bengali refugees (including tribals) started with the partition of Bengal in 1947. Up to around 1951, two-fifths of the refugees settled in South Bengal, the balance settled in the North Bengal districts of West Dinajpur, Jalpaiguri and Cooch Behar. Erstwhile West Dinajpur alone received around 6.5% of the early entrants. The steady flow of people into Dakshin Dinajpur has continued over the years from erstwhile East Pakistan and subsequently from Bangladesh.

=== Literacy ===
As per the 2011 census, the total number of literates in Balurghat CD Block was 167,353 (73.96% of the population over 6 years) out of which males numbered 93,736 (80.25% of the male population over 6 years) and females numbered 73,617 (67.24% of the female population over 6 years). The gender disparity (the difference between female and male literacy rates) was 13.01%.

See also – List of West Bengal districts ranked by literacy rate

Literacy in CD blocks of
Dakshin Dinajpur district
Balurghat subdivision
Balurghat – 73.96%
Hili – 76.04%
Kumarganj – 74.57%
Tapan – 68.62%
Gangrampur subdivision
Bansihari – 68.79%
Gangarampur – 71.45%
Harirampur – 64.67%
Kushmandi – 65.43%
Source: 2011 Census: CD Block Wise
Primary Census Abstract Data

=== Language and religion ===
Religion in Balurghat CD block (2011)
| Hinduism | 92.18% |
| Islam | 5.33% |
| Christianity | 2.00% |
| Other or not stated | 0.49% |

As per 2014 District Statistical Handbook: Dakshin Dinajpur (quoting census figures), in the 2001 census, in Balurghat CD Block, Hindus numbered 211,223 and formed 92.34% of the population. Muslims numbered 11,847 and formed 5.18% of the population. Christians numbered 5,068 and formed 2.22% of the population. Others numbered 598 and formed 0.26% of the population. In the 2011 census, 229,446 (92.18%) were Hindus and 13,266 (5.33%) Muslims, while 4,972 were Christian.

According to the 2011 District Census Handbook: Dakshin Dinajpur, during 2011 census, majority of the population of the district were Hindus constituting 73.5% of the population followed by Muslims with 24.6% of the population. The proportion of Hindu population of the district increased from 59.9% in 1961 to 74.0 %in 2001 and then dropped to 73.5% in 2011. The proportion of Muslim population in the district decreased from 39.4% in 1961 to 24.0% in 2001 and then increased to 24.6% in 2011.

Languages of Balurghat CD block (2011)
1. Bengali (75.5%)
2. Santali (12.6%)
3. Sadri (2.86%)
4. Mundari (2.00%)
5. Kurukh (1.61%)
6. Kurmali (1.50%)
7. Hindi (1.45%)
8. Others (2.42%)

At the time of the 2011 census, 75.55% of the population spoke Bengali, 12.61% Santali, 2.86% Sadri, 2.00% Mundari, 1.61% Kurukh, 1.50% Kurmali and 1.45% Hindi as their first language.

== Rural poverty ==
As per the Human Development Report 2004 for West Bengal, the rural poverty ratio in erstwhile West Dinajpur district was 27.61%. Malda district on the south of West Dinajpur district had a rural poverty ratio of 35.4% and Jalpaiguri district on the north had a rural poverty ratio of 35.73%. These estimates were based on Central Sample data of NSS 55th round 1999–2000.

As per BPL Survey by the Government of West Bengal, the proportion of BPL families in Dakshin Dinajpur district was 43.54% as on 30 October 2002.

== Economy ==
=== Livelihood ===
Livelihood
in Balurghat CD Block
1. Cultivators (26.3%)
2. Agricultural labourers (38.2%)
3. Household industries (5.29%)
4. Other Workers (30.2%)

In Balurghat CD Block in 2011, amongst the class of total workers, cultivators numbered 29,864 and formed 26.29%, agricultural labourers numbered 43,309 and formed 38.20%, household industry workers numbered 6,010 and formed 5.29% and other workers numbered 34,337 and formed 30.22%. Total workers numbered 113,610 and formed 45.64% of the total population, and non-workers numbered 135,291 and formed 54.36% of the population.

Note: In the census records a person is considered a cultivator, if the person is engaged in cultivation/ supervision of land owned by self/government/institution. When a person who works on another person's land for wages in cash or kind or share, is regarded as an agricultural labourer. Household industry is defined as an industry conducted by one or more members of the family within the household or village, and one that does not qualify for registration as a factory under the Factories Act. Other workers are persons engaged in some economic activity other than cultivators, agricultural labourers and household workers. It includes factory, mining, plantation, transport and office workers, those engaged in business and commerce, teachers, entertainment artistes and so on.

=== Infrastructure ===
There are 294 inhabited villages in Balurghat CD Block. All 294 villages (100%) have power supply. All 294 villages (100%) have drinking water supply. 32 villages (10.88%) have post offices. 269 villages (91.5%) have telephones (including landlines, public call offices and mobile phones). 121 villages (41.16%) have a pucca (paved) approach road and 89 villages (30.27%) have transport communication (includes bus service, rail facility and navigable waterways). 11 villages (3.74%) have agricultural credit societies. 9 villages (3.06%) have banks.

=== Agriculture ===
The land is fertile for agricultural production, particularly in the southern part of the district. The rivers are flood-prone but droughts also occur occasionally. There are numerous tanks and some marshes and bils. Multiple cropping is widely practised. The Tebhaga movement by the share croppers, towards the end of British rule, is widely known. There are some forests, mostly in areas bordering Bangladesh.

Balurghat CD Block had 118 fertiliser depots, 60 seed stores and 16 fair price shops in 2013–14.

In 2013–14, Balurghat CD Block produced 2,944 tonnes of Aman paddy, the main winter crop from 1,213 hectares, 13,500 tonnes of Boro paddy (spring crop) from 4,459 hectares, 5,616 tonnes of wheat from 1,824 hectares, 83,817 tonnes of jute from 5,004 hectares and 23,330 tonnes of potatoes from 905 hectares. It also produced pulses and oilseeds.

In 2013–14, the total area irrigated in Balurghat CD Block was 8,182 hectares, out of which 922 hectares were irrigated by tank irrigation, 3,367 hectares by river lift irrigation, 1,224 hectares by deep tube wells and 2,669 hectares by shallow tube wells.

=== Banking ===
In 2013–14, Balurghat CD Block had offices of 21 commercial banks and 7 gramin banks.

=== Backward Regions Grant Fund ===
Dakshin Dinajpur district is listed as a backward region and receives financial support from the Backward Regions Grant Fund. The fund, created by the Government of India, is designed to redress regional imbalances in development. As of 2012, 272 districts across the country were listed under this scheme. The list includes 11 districts of West Bengal.

== Transport ==
Balurghat CD Block has 8 ferry services and 12 originating/ terminating bus routes.

The Eklakhi–Balurghat branch line passes through this CD Block and there are stations at Balurghat and Mallickpur Hat.

State Highway 10 passes through this block.

== Education ==
In 2013–14, Balurghat CD Block had 195 primary schools with 10,790 students, 1 middle school with 75 students, 14 high schools with 23,315 students and 17 higher secondary schools with 18,101 students. Balurghat CD Block had 1 general degree college with 396 students, 3 technical/ professional institutions with 285 students and 374 institutions for special and non-formal education with 11,832 students. There were 2 general degree colleges with 6,397 students and 1 technical/ professional institute with 100 students and other educational facilities at Balurghat (outside the CD Block).

In Balurghat CD Block, amongst the 294 inhabited villages, 66 villages do not have a school, 35 villages have more than 1 primary school, 35 villages have at least 1 primary and 1 middle school and 31 villages have at least 1 middle and 1 secondary school.

Jamini Majumdar Memorial College was established at Patiram in 2008.

== Healthcare ==
In 2014, Balurghat CD Block had 1 rural hospital, 1 block primary health centre, 4 primary health centres and 2 private/ NGO nursing home, with total 168 beds and 9 doctors (excluding private bodies). It had 52 family welfare subcentres. 1,529 patients were treated indoor and 203,032 patients were treated outdoor in the hospitals, health centres and subcentres of the CD Block. Balurghat had 1 hospital, 2 state government/ local units and 2 private/ NGO nursing homes with total 525 beds and 37 doctors (excluding private bodies) (outside the CD Block).

Khaspur Rural Hospital at Khaspur (with 30 beds) is the main medical facility in Balurghat CD Block. There are primary health centres at Bara Kasipur (Bharandah (Bolader) PHC) (with 10 beds), Bolla (with 10 beds), Nazirpur (with 10 beds), Chak Bhrigu (Dakra PHC) (with 10 beds) and Kamarpara (with 10 beds).
