= Dəvrallı =

Coordinates: 40°31′N 45°54′E

Dəvrallı is a village in the municipality of Tapan in the Dashkasan Rayon of Azerbaijan.
