= State Highway 10 (West Bengal) =

State highway in India

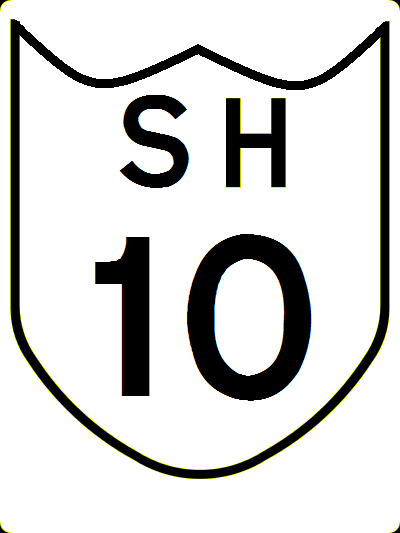
State Highway 10

Route information
- Length: 175 km (109 mi)

Major junctions
- From: Junction with NH 12 at Malda
- NH 131A from Ratua to Samsi; NH 31 at Samsi; NH 131A continues from Samsi to Gazole; NH 12 at Gazole; NH 512 from Gazole to Hili via Buniadpur, Gangarampur and Balurghat; SH 10A (WB) at Buniadpur; Patiram-Hili Highway at Patiram
- To: Hili

Location
- Country: India
- State: West Bengal
- Districts: Malda, Dakshin Dinajpur

Highway system
- Roads in India; Expressways; National; State; Asian; State Highways in West Bengal

State Highway 10 (West Bengal) is a state highway in West Bengal, India.

== Route ==
SH 10 originates from Malda Town and passes through Manikchak, Ratua, Samsi, Gazole Town, Madnahar, Buniadpur, Gangarampur, Patiram, Balurghat and Chapahat and terminates at Hili. The total length of SH 10 is 173 km.

== Road sections ==
It is divided into different sections as follows:

Road Section	District	CD Block	Length (km)
Malda-English Bazar-Manikchak	Malda	English Bazar, Manickchak	33
Manickchak-Ratua	Malda	Ratua II	16
Ratua-Samsi	Malda		13
Samsi-Gazole (via NH 81)	Malda	Gazole	-
Gazole-Buniadpur	Malda, Dakshin Dinajpur	Bansihari	30
Buniadpur-Gangarampur-Balurghat	Dakshin Dinajpur	Gangarampur, Kumarganj, Balurghat	55
Balurghat-Hili	Dakshin Dinajpur	Hili	26

== See also ==
- List of state highways in West Bengal
