= Bachchu Hansda =

Indian politician

Member of West Bengal Legislative Assembly
- In office 2011–2021
- Constituency: Tapan

Minister of State for North Bengal Development
- In office 2016–2021

Personal details
- Born: 1 March 1979 (age 47)
- Party: All India Trinamool Congress
- Other political affiliations: Bharatiya Janata Party
- Profession: Politician, Teacher

Bachchu Hansda (born 1 March 1979) is an Indian politician from Tapan in West Bengal. He served as the Minister of State for North Bengal Development in the Government of West Bengal from 2016 to 2021. Hansda was elected twice to the West Bengal Legislative Assembly from the Tapan constituency, in 2011 and 2016.

Hansda faced allegations of widespread corruption, including accusations of accepting large sums of money from individuals in exchange for appointments to government teaching positions at various school levels. As a result of these allegations, the Trinamool Congress denied him a ticket to contest the 2021 West Bengal Legislative Assembly election, later Hansda joined opposition party Bharatiya Janata Party.

== Political career ==
Hansda was first nominated as a candidate by the All India Trinamool Congress in the 2011 West Bengal Legislative Assembly election, where he contested against Revolutionary Socialist Party leader Khara Soren. Hansda won the election with a margin of 18,657 votes, securing a total of 72,643 votes, and Soren received 53,986 votes.

In the 2016 West Bengal Legislative Assembly election, Hansda was again fielded by the TMC. He contested against RSP leader Urow Raghu and won the election with a reduced margin of 4,401 votes, obtaining 72,511 votes, while Raghu received 68,110 votes. Following this victory, Hansda was appointed the Minister of State for North Bengal Development in the Mamata Banerjee-led government.

Hansda later faced allegations of widespread corruption, including accusations of accepting large sums of money from individuals in exchange for appointments to government teaching positions. As a consequence of these allegations, the TMC denied him a ticket for the 2021 West Bengal Legislative Assembly election.

On 10 April 2021, after TMC denied him ticket, Hansda joined the Bharatiya Janata Party, the primary opposition party in West Bengal, in the presence of Dilip Ghosh at an event in Kolkata. Seven days later he expressed his desire to rejoin the Trinamool Congress; the party declined his request. Since then, Hansda has not been affiliated with any political party and teaches at schools that he owns.
