= Hili (community development block) =

- Community development block
- Coordinates: 25.286°N 88.994°E
- Country: India
- State: West Bengal
- District: Dakshin Dinajpur

Area
  - Total: 88.10 km^{2} (34.02 sq mi)

Population (2011)
  - Total: 83,754
  - Density: 950.7/km^{2} (2,462/sq mi)

Languages
  - Official: Bengali, English
- Time zone: UTC+5:30 (IST)
- Lok Sabha constituency: Balurghat
- Vidhan Sabha constituency: Balurghat
- Website: ddinajpur.nic.in

Hili is a community development block that forms an administrative division in Balurghat subdivision of Dakshin Dinajpur district in the Indian state of West Bengal.

== History ==
Dinajpur district was constituted in 1786. In 1947, the Radcliffe Line placed the Sadar and Thakurgaon subdivisions of Dinajpur district in East Pakistan. The Balurghat subdivision of Dinajpur district was reconstituted as West Dinajpur district in West Bengal. The new Raiganj subdivision was formed in 1948. In order to restore territorial links between northern and southern parts of West Bengal which had been snapped during the partition of Bengal, and on the recommendations of the States Reorganisation Commission a portion of the erstwhile Kishanganj subdivision comprising Goalpokhar, Islampur and Chopra thanas (police stations) and parts of Thakurganj thana, along with the adjacent parts of the erstwhile Gopalpur thana in Katihar subdivision were transferred from Purnea district in Bihar to West Bengal in 1956, and were formally incorporated into Raiganj subdivision in West Dinajpur. The township of Kishanganj and its entire municipal boundary remained within Bihar. With the introduction of the Community Development Programme in 1960–61, community development blocks were set up in West Dinajpur district. In 1992, West Dinajpur district was bifurcated and Dakshin Dinajpur district was established.

== Geography ==
Hili is located at 25.286°N 88.994°E.

Dakshin Dinajpur district is physiographically a part of the Barind Tract. The area is generally flat and slightly undulating. The elevation of the district is about 15 metres above mean sea level. However, the soil varies. CD Blocks such as Balurghat, Hili and Kumarganj have alluvial soil, Tapan CD Block has laterite soil. There are three main rivers. The Atreyee comes from Bangladesh, flows through Kumarganj and Balurghat CD Blocks and goes back to Bangladesh. The Punarbhaba flows through Gangarampur and Tapan CD Blocks. The Tangon flows through Kushmandi and Bansihari CD Blocks. There is a small river named Jamuna in the Hili CD Block. All rivers, flowing from north to south, overflow during the monsoons and cause floods.

Hili CD Block is bounded by Birampur Upazila in Dinajpur District in Bangladesh, on the north, Hakimpur Upazila in Dinajpur District, and Panchbibi Upazila in Joypurhat District, both in Bangladesh, on the east, and Balurghat CD Block, on the south and the west.

Six out of the eight CD Blocks in the district are on the India-Bangladesh border, popularly identified as a porous border. 2,216 km of the 4,096 km long India-Bangladesh border falls in West Bengal. More than 11,000 people live near/ around the zero line in Dakshin Dinajpur. Approximately 252 km of the international border is in Dakshin Dinajpur district.

Hili CD Block has an area of 90.78 km^{2}.It has 1 panchayat samity, 5 gram panchayats, 55 gram sansads (village councils), 82 mouzas and 79 inhabited villages. Hili police station serves this block. Headquarters of this CD Block is at Hili.

Gram panchayats of Hili block/ panchayat samiti are: Binshira, Dhalpara, Hili, Jamalpur, and Panjul.

== Demographics ==
=== Population ===
As per 2011 Census of India, Hili CD Block had a total population of 83,754, all of which were rural. There were 42,981 (51%) males and 40,773 (49%) females. Population below 6 years was 8,262. Scheduled Castes numbered 21,532 (25.71%) and Scheduled Tribes numbered 15,293 (18.26%).

As per 2001 census, Hili block has a total population of 77,246, out of which 39,532 were males and 37714 were females. Hili block registered a population growth of 24.98 per cent during the 1991–2001 decade. Decadal growth for the district was 22.11 per cent.

Villages in Hili CD Block included (2011 population in brackets): Hilli (2,185), Dhalpara (1,438), Binsira (2,090), Jamalpur (3,618) and Panjul (1,014).

Decadal growth of population in Hili CD Block for the period 2001–2011 was 8.42%. Decadal growth of population in Dakhin Dinajpur district during the same period was 11.52% down from 22.15% in the previous decade. Decadal growth of population in West Bengal for the corresponding periods was 13.93% and 17.77% respectively.

The large scale migration of the East Bengali refugees (including tribals) started with the partition of Bengal in 1947. Up to around 1951, two-fifths of the refugees settled in South Bengal, the balance settled in the North Bengal districts of West Dinajpur, Jalpaiguri and Cooch Behar. Erstwhile West Dinajpur alone received around 6.5% of the early entrants. The steady flow of people into Dakshin Dinajpur has continued over the years from erstwhile East Pakistan and subsequently from Bangladesh.

=== Literacy ===
As per the 2011 census, the total number of literates in Hili CD Block was 57,402 (76.04% of the population over 6 years) out of which males numbered 31,789 (81.97% of the male population over 6 years) and females numbered 25,613 (69.77% of the female population over 6 years). The gender disparity (the difference between female and male literacy rates) was 12.21%.

See also – List of West Bengal districts ranked by literacy rate

Literacy in CD blocks of
Dakshin Dinajpur district
Balurghat subdivision
Balurghat – 73.96%
Hili – 76.04%
Kumarganj – 74.57%
Tapan – 68.62%
Gangrampur subdivision
Bansihari – 68.79%
Gangarampur – 71.45%
Harirampur – 64.67%
Kushmandi – 65.43%
Source: 2011 Census: CD Block Wise
Primary Census Abstract Data

=== Language and religion ===
Religion in Hili CD block (2011)
Hinduism	87.56%
Islam	10.12%
Christianity	1.72%
Other or not stated	0.60%

As per 2014 District Statistical Handbook: Dakshin Dinajpur (quoting census figures), in the 2001 census, in Hili CD Block, Hindus numbered 68,190 and formed 88.27% of the population. Muslims numbered 7,439 and formed 9.63% of the population. Christians numbered 1,339 and formed 1.73% of the population. Others numbered 282 and formed 0.37% of the population. In the 2011 census, 73,332 (87.56%) were Hindus and 8,475 (10.12%) Muslims, while 1,441 were Christian.

According to the 2011 District Census Handbook: Dakshin Dinajpur, during 2011 census, majority of the population of the district were Hindus constituting 73.5% of the population followed by Muslims with 24.6% of the population. The proportion of Hindu population of the district increased from 59.9% in 1961 to 74.0 %in 2001 and then dropped to 73.5% in 2011. The proportion of Muslim population in the district decreased from 39.4% in 1961 to 24.0% in 2001 and then increased to 24.6% in 2011.

Languages of Hili CD block (2011)
1. Bengali (79.7%)
2. Santali (5.88%)
3. Sadri (3.76%)
4. Mundari (1.88%)
5. Kurukh (1.86%)
6. Hindi (1.81%)
7. Kurmali (1.53%)
8. Others (3.54%)

At the time of the 2011 census, 82.13% of the population spoke Bengali, 5.88% Santali, 3.76% Sadri, 1.88% Mundari, 1.86% Kurukh, 1.81% Hindi and 1.53% Kurmali as their first language.

== Rural poverty ==
As per the Human Development Report 2004 for West Bengal, the rural poverty ratio in erstwhile West Dinajpur district was 27.61%. Malda district on the south of West Dinajpur district had a rural poverty ratio of 35.4% and Jalpaiguri district on the north had a rural poverty ratio of 35.73%. These estimates were based on Central Sample data of NSS 55th round 1999–2000.

As per BPL Survey by the Government of West Bengal, the proportion of BPL families in Dakshin Dinajpur district was 43.54% as on 30 October 2002.

== Economy ==
=== Livelihood ===
Livelihood
in Hili CD Block
1. Cultivators (23.2%)
2. Agricultural labourers (34.2%)
3. Household industries (12.7%)
4. Other Workers (30.0%)

In Hili CD Block in 2011, amongst the class of total workers, cultivators numbered 8,716 and formed 23.16%, agricultural labourers numbered 12,859 and formed 34.17%, household industry workers numbered 4,771 and formed 12.68% and other workers numbered 11,290 and formed 30.00%. Total workers numbered 37,636 and formed 44.94% of the total population, and non-workers numbered 46,118 and formed 55.06% of the population.

Note: In the census records a person is considered a cultivator, if the person is engaged in cultivation/ supervision of land owned by self/government/institution. When a person who works on another person's land for wages in cash or kind or share, is regarded as an agricultural labourer. Household industry is defined as an industry conducted by one or more members of the family within the household or village, and one that does not qualify for registration as a factory under the Factories Act. Other workers are persons engaged in some economic activity other than cultivators, agricultural labourers and household workers. It includes factory, mining, plantation, transport and office workers, those engaged in business and commerce, teachers, entertainment artistes and so on.

=== Infrastructure ===
There are 79 inhabited villages in Hili CD Block. All 79 villages (100%) have power supply. 78 villages (98.73%) have drinking water supply. 10 villages (12.66%) have post offices. 75 villages (94.94%) have telephones (including landlines, public call offices and mobile phones). 64 villages (81.01%) have a pucca (paved) approach road and 26 villages (32.91%) have transport communication (includes bus service, rail facility and navigable waterways). 2 villages (2.53%) have agricultural credit societies. 6 villages (7.59%) have banks.

=== Agriculture ===
The land is fertile for agricultural production, particularly in the southern part of the district. The rivers are flood-prone but droughts also occur occasionally. There are numerous tanks and some marshes and bils. Multiple cropping is widely practised. The Tebhaga movement by the share croppers, towards the end of British rule, is widely known. There are some forests, mostly in areas bordering Bangladesh.

Hili CD Block had 118 fertiliser depots, 60 seed stores and 16 fair price shops in 2013–14.

In 2013–14, Hili CD Block produced 1,526 tonnes of Aman paddy, the main winter crop from 656 hectares, 4,482 tonnes of Boro paddy (spring crop) from 1,311 hectares, 1,263 tonnes of wheat from 398 hectares, 16,729 tonnes of jute from 1,189 hectares and 4,196 tonnes of potatoes from 192 hectares. It also produced pulses and oilseeds.

In 2013–14, the total area irrigated in Hili CD Block was 1,727 hectares, out of which 341 hectares were irrigated by tank irrigation, 19 hectares by river lift irrigation, 351 hectares by deep tube wells and 1,016 hectares by shallow tube wells.

=== Banking ===
In 2013–14, Hili CD Block had offices of 2 commercial banks and 2 gramin banks.

=== Backward Regions Grant Fund ===
Dakshin Dinajpur district is listed as a backward region and receives financial support from the Backward Regions Grant Fund. The fund, created by the Government of India, is designed to redress regional imbalances in development. As of 2012, 272 districts across the country were listed under this scheme. The list includes 11 districts of West Bengal.

== Transport ==
At the time of partition in 1947, Hili Railway Station got located in Pakistan and is now in Hakimpur Upazila of Bangladesh.

Extension of the Eklakhi-Balurghat Branch Line to Hili was announced in the Rail Budget for 2010–11. Initial work for the 29.6 km Balurghat-Hili railway line has been taken up by Northeast Frontier Railway. In the initial stages major expenditure is anticipated for land acquisition. The estimates are around Rs. 300 crores. 166.281 ha of land is required to be acquired. District Magistrate, Dakshin Dinajpur is also involved in the process.

Hili CD Block has 8 originating/ terminating bus routes. The nearest railway station is 25 km from the CD Block headquarters.

The eastern terminus of State Highway 10 is at Hili.

== Education ==
In 2013–14, Hili CD Block had 72 primary schools with 5,107 students, 4 middle schools with 220 students, 7 high schools with 8,433 students and 4 higher secondary schools with 4,337 students. Hili CD Block had 267 institutions for special and non-formal education with 4,918 students.

In Hili CD Block, amongst the 79 inhabited villages, 14 villages do not have a school, 11 villages have more than 1 primary school, 12 villages have at least 1 primary and 1 middle school and 10 villages have at least 1 middle and 1 secondary school.

== Healthcare ==
In 2014, Hili CD Block had 1 rural hospital and 2 primary health centres with total 35 beds and 8 doctors (excluding private bodies). It had 14 family welfare subcentres. 3,299 patients were treated indoor and 172,105 patients were treated outdoor in the hospitals, health centres and subcentres of the CD Block.

Hili Rural Hospital at Hili (with 25 beds) is the main medical facility in Hili CD Block. There are primary health centres at Tear (Binsira PHC) (with 10 beds) and Trimohini (with 10 beds).
