= Dwip Khanda =

Village in West Bengal

Dwip Khanda Dwipkhanda
- Village
- Location within West Bengal Location within India
- Coordinates: 25°18′0.56″N 88°35′50.47″E
- Country: India
- State: West Bengal
- District: Dakshin Dinajpur

Area
  - Total: 3.6442 km^{2} (1.4070 sq mi)

Population (2011)
  - Total: 1,432
  - Male: 758
  - Female: 674

Muslims = 100% ▲ Hindus = % Others (Christian, Sikh, Buddhists) = 0%

Languages
  - Official: Bengali, English
- Time zone: UTC+5:30 (IST)
- PIN: 733127
- Telephone Code: 03524
- Vehicle registration: WB
- Climate: Moderate, Comfortable (Köppen)
- Lok Sabha constituency: Balurghat
- Nearest city: Tapan
- Website: ddinajpur.nic.in

Dwip Khanda or Dwipkhanda, is a village located in Tapan subdivision of Dakshin Dinajpur district in West Bengal, India.

== Location ==
It is situated 5 km (3.1 mi) from sub-district headquarters Tapan. Balurghat is the district headquarters of this village. Dwipkhanda gram panchayat is the gram panchayat of this village. The total geographical area of the village is 364.42 hectares (900.5 acres; 3.6442 km^{2}). The village code of this village is 311513.

== Population ==
With about 324 houses, this village has a total population of 1,432 people amongst them are 758 male and 674 female and a total geographical area of 84.75 hectares (209.4 acres) or 3.6442 km^{2}. The literacy rate of the total population of this village is 71.02% among 74.67% males and 66.91% females are literate.

== See also ==
- Tapan town in Dakshin Dinajpur.
- Majhi Khanda village in Dakshin Dinajpur.
