= Güneykənd =

- Location within Azerbaijan
- Coordinates: 40°29′35″N 45°54′31″E
- Country: Azerbaijan
- Rayon: Dashkasan
- Municipality: Tapan
- Time zone: UTC+4 (AZT)
  - Summer (DST): UTC+5 (AZT)

Güneykənd (also, Gyuneykend) is a village in the Dashkasan Rayon of Azerbaijan. The village forms part of the municipality of Tapan.
