= Budhrai Tudu =

Indian politician

Member of the West Bengal Legislative Assembly
- In office 2 May 2021 – Incumbent
- Preceded by: Bachchu Hansda
- Constituency: Tapan

Personal details
- Party: Bharatiya Janata Party
- Education: B.A.
- Alma mater: Balurghat College
- Profession: Teacher, Politician

Budhrai Tudu is an Indian politician from West Bengal. He is a member of the Bharatiya Janata Party. In May 2021, he was elected as a member of the West Bengal Legislative Assembly from Tapan constituency. He defeated Kalpana Kisku of All India Trinamool Congress by 1,650 votes in 2021 West Bengal Assembly election. In 2026, he won form the same consistency.

== See also ==
- 2026 West Bengal Legislative Assembly election
- List of chief ministers of West Bengal
- West Bengal Legislative Assembly
