= Hili, Dakshin Dinajpur =

Hili
- Village
- Location in West Bengal, India Hili (India)
- Coordinates: 25.286°N 88.994°E
- Country: India
- State: West Bengal
- District: Dakshin Dinajpur

Population (2011)
  - Total: 2,185

Languages
  - Official: Bengali, English
- Time zone: UTC+5:30 (IST)
- Postal code: 733126
- Vehicle registration: WB
- Lok Sabha constituency: Balurghat
- Vidhan Sabha constituency: Balurghat

Hili is a village in Hili CD Block in Balurghat subdivision of Dakshin Dinajpur district in the Indian state of West Bengal. It is a border checkpoint on the India-Bangladesh border.

== History ==
During the Indo-Pakistani War of 1971 nearly 400 soldiers of both India and Pakistan were killed in the war that continued from 24 November to 11 December 1971 on the Hili border.

== Geography ==
Cities and towns in the Dakshin Dinajpur district
M: municipal city/ town, CT: census town, R: rural/ urban centre, H: historical site
Owing to space constraints in the small map, the actual locations in a larger map may vary slightly

=== Location ===
Hili is located at 25°17′10″N 88°59′38″E.

In the map alongside, all places marked on the map are linked in the full screen version.

=== Police station ===
Hili police station under West Bengal police has jurisdiction over Hili CD Block.

=== CD block HQ ===
The headquarters of Hili CD block is at Hili.

=== Border checkpoint and land port ===
Hili is a land port and border checkpoint, on the Bangladesh-India border, being developed (in 2018) as an integrated checkpost (ICP) for the smooth movement of goods and people. As a part of Hili is located in Bangladesh, the other side of the border is known as Hili Land Port in Hakimpur Upazila in Dinajpur district of Bangladesh. Sizeable trade activity is carried on with trucks traveling across the border.

There is a customs office for export/import at Hili.

Intergovernmental Agreement on Dry Ports is a 2013 United Nations treaty designed to promote the cooperation of the development of dry ports in the Asia-Pacific region.

Hili is on the India-Bangladesh border, popularly identified as a porous border. 2,216 km of the 4,096 km long India-Bangladesh border falls in West Bengal. More than 11,000 people live near/ around the zero line in Dakshin Dinajpur. Approximately 252 km of the international border is in Dakshin Dinajpur district.

== Demographics ==
As per the 2011 Census of India, Hili had a total population of 2,185, of which 1,181 (50%) were males and 1,084 (50%) were females. Population below 6 years was 173. The total number of literates in Hili was 1,839 (91.40% of the population over 6 years).

== Transport ==
At the time of partition in 1947, Hili railway station (now on Chilahati-Parbatipur-Santahar-Darshana line) got located in Pakistan and is now in Hakimpur Upazila of Bangladesh.

Extension of the Eklakhi-Balurghat Branch Line to Hili was announced in the Rail Budget for 2010–11. Initial work for the 29.6 km Balurghat-Hili railway line has been taken up by Northeast Frontier Railway. In the initial stages major expenditure is anticipated for land acquisition. The estimates are around Rs. 300 crores. 166.281 ha of land is required to be acquired. District Magistrate, Dakshin Dinajpur is also involved in the process. The project is still undone due to some political issues.

State Highway 10, originating from Malda Town terminates at Hili.

Hili is well connected with its neighbouring & main cities of West Bengal by means of buses. There are plenty of private buses from Hili to Balurghat departing at the interval of 15 minutes. There is also government bus service NBSTC from Hili to Malda, Berhampore, Siliguri, Raiganj.

Everyday, a number of buses like Shyamoli Paribahan, Royal Cruiser etc. departs for Kolkata & few buses also leave for Siliguri and Cooch Behar.

== Education ==
S.B.S. Government College, Hili was established at Hili in 2015. It is affiliated with the University of Gour Banga and offers honours courses in Bengali, Sanskrit, English, History, Philosophy and Zoology, and general courses in arts and science.

Hili Rama Nath High School, established in 1914, is a government-sponsored high school.

Hili Girls’ High School, a higher secondary school, was established in 1923.

Fatepur Balupara High School, a co-educational higher secondary school, established in 1985.

There are 13 free primary schools across the village run by state government.

Hilli Government Polytechnic

== Healthcare ==
Hili Rural Hospital at Hili (with 25 beds) is the main medical facility in Hili CD Block. There are primary health centres at Tear (Binsira PHC) (with 10 beds) and Trimohini (with 10 beds).
