= Tapan, Azerbaijan =

Tapan
- Municipality
- Location within Azerbaijan
- Coordinates: 40°29′30″N 45°53′07″E
- Country: Azerbaijan
- Rayon: Dashkasan

Population
  - Total: 758
- Time zone: UTC+4 (AZT)
  - Summer (DST): UTC+5 (AZT)

Tapan is a village and municipality in the Dashkasan Rayon of Azerbaijan. It has a population of 758. The municipality consists of the villages of Tapan, Dəvrallı, and Güneykənd.
