= Tapani (surname) =

Tapani is a Finnish surname. Notable people with the surname include:

- Esa Tapani (born 1968), Finnish horn player
- Kevin Tapani (born 1964), American baseball pitcher
- Susanna Tapani (born 1993), Finnish athlete
