= Tapan (community development block) =

- Community development block
- Coordinates: 25.2886300°N 88.5764390°E
- Country: India
- State: West Bengal
- District: Dakshin Dinajpur

Area
  - Total: 441.10 km^{2} (170.31 sq mi)

Population (2011)
  - Total: 250,540
  - Density: 567.99/km^{2} (1,471.1/sq mi)

Languages
  - Official: Bengali, English
- Time zone: UTC+5:30 (IST)
- Lok Sabha constituency: Balurghat
- Vidhan Sabha constituency: Tapan, Gangarampur
- Website: ddinajpur.nic.in

Tapan is a community development block that forms an administrative division in Balurghat subdivision of Dakshin Dinajpur district in the Indian state of West Bengal.

== History ==
Dinajpur district was constituted in 1786. In 1947, the Radcliffe Line placed the Sadar and Thakurgaon subdivisions of Dinajpur district in East Pakistan. tapan The Balurghat subdivision of Dinajpur district was reconstituted as West Dinajpur district in West Bengal. The new Raiganj subdivision was formed in 1948. In order to restore territorial links between northern and southern parts of West Bengal which had been snapped during the partition of Bengal, and on the recommendations of the States Reorganisation Commission a portion of the erstwhile Kishanganj subdivision comprising Goalpokhar, Islampur and Chopra thanas (police stations) and parts of Thakurganj thana, tapan along with the adjacent parts of the erstwhile Gopalpur thana in Katihar subdivision were transferred from Purnea district in Bihar to West Bengal in 1956, and were formally incorporated into Raiganj subdivision in West Dinajpur. The township of Kishanganj and its entire municipal boundary remained within Bihar. With the introduction of the Community tapan Development Programme in 1960-61, community development blocks were set up tapan in West Dinajpur district. In 1992, West Dinajpur district was bifurcated and Dakshin Dinajpur district was established. MR.TAPAN

== Geography ==
Tapan is located at 25.2886300°N 88.5764390°E.

Dakshin Dinajpur district is physiographically a part of the Barind Tract. The area is generally flat and slightly undulating. The elevation of the district is about 15 metres above mean sea level. However, the soil varies. CD Blocks such as Balurghat, Hili and Kumarganj have alluvial soil, Tapan CD Block has laterite soil. There are three main rivers. The Atreyee comes from Bangladesh, flows through Kumarganj and Balurghat CD Blocks and goes back to Bangladesh. The Punarbhaba flows through Gangarampur and Tapan CD Blocks. The Tangon flows through Kushmandi and Bansihari CD Blocks. There is a small river named Jamuna in the Hili CD Block. All rivers, flowing from north to south, overflow during the monsoons and cause floods.

Tapan CD Block is bounded by Gangarampur CD Block on the north, Balurghat CD Block on the east, Dhamoirhat, Patnitala and Sapahar Upazilas, all in Naogaon District in Bangladesh, on the south, and Bansihari CD Block and BamangolaCD Block in Malda district on the west.

Six out of the eight CD Blocks in the district are on the India-Bangladesh border popularly referred to as a porous border. 2,216 km of the 4,096 km long India-Bangladesh border falls in West Bengal. More than 11,000 people live near/ around the zero line in Dakshin Dinajpur. Approximately 252 km of the international border is in Dakshin Dinajpur district.

Tapan CD Block has an area of 445.63 km^{2}.It has 1 panchayat samity, 11 gram panchayats, 166 gram sansads (village councils), 279 mouzas and 271 inhabited villages. Tapan police station serves this block. Headquarters of this CD Block is at Tapan.

Gram panchayats of Tapan block/ panchayat samiti are: Ajmatpur, Autina, Dipkhanda, Gofanagar, Gurail, Harsura, Hazratpur, Malancha, Ramchandrapur, Ramparachechra and Tapanchandipur.

== Demographics ==
=== Population ===
As per 2011 Census of India, Tapan CD Block had a total population of 250,764, all of which were rural. There were 128,500 (51%) males and 122,004 (49%) females. Population below 6 years was 28,276. Scheduled Castes numbered 80,963 (32.32%) and Scheduled Tribes numbered 55,965 (22.34%).

As per 2001 census Tapan block had a population of 226,136 of which 115,809 are males and 110,327 are females.

Large villages (with 4,000+ population) in Tapan CD Block were (2011 population in brackets): Mandapara (4,262), Naogon (4,908), Bazrapukur (8,538), Salas (4,772) and Ramchandrapur (4,538).

Other villages in Tapan CD Block included (2011 population in brackets): Tapan (2,796), Ajmatpur (1,920), Gofanagar (654), Dwip Khanda (1,432), Hazratpur (3,225), Malancha (1,515) and Rampara Chenchra (1,379).

Decadal growth of population in Tapan CD Block for the period 2001-2011 was 10.78%. Decadal growth of population in Dakhin Dinajpur district during the same period was 11.52% down from 22.15% in the previous decade. Decadal growth of population in West Bengal for the corresponding periods was 13.93% and 17.77% respectively.

The large scale migration of the East Bengali refugees (including tribals) started with the partition of Bengal in 1947. Up to around 1951, two-fifths of the refugees settled in South Bengal, the balance settled in the North Bengal districts of West Dinajpur, Jalpaiguri and Cooch Behar. Erstwhile West Dinajpur alone received around 6.5% of the early entrants. The steady flow of people into Dakshin Dinajpur has continued over the years from erstwhile East Pakistan and subsequently from Bangladesh.

=== Literacy ===
As per the 2011 census, the total number of literates in Tapan CD Block was 152,482 (68.62% of the population over 6 years) out of which males numbered 84,656 (74.24% of the male population over 6 years) and females numbered 67,826 (62.69% of the female population over 6 years). The gender disparity (the difference between female and male literacy rates) was 11.55%.

See also – List of West Bengal districts ranked by literacy rate

Literacy in CD blocks of
Dakshin Dinajpur district
Balurghat subdivision
Balurghat – 73.96%
Hili – 76.04%
Kumarganj – 74.57%
Tapan – 68.62%
Gangrampur subdivision
Bansihari – 68.79%
Gangarampur – 71.45%
Harirampur – 64.67%
Kushmandi – 65.43%
Source: 2011 Census: CD Block Wise
Primary Census Abstract Data

=== Language and religion ===
In 2001, Bengali was the mother-tongue of 82.2% of the population of Dakshin Dinajpur district, followed by Santali (10.3%), Hindi (1.8%), Kurukh/ Oraon (1.7%), Munda (0.5%), Sadan/Sadri (0.5%), Kurmali Thar (0.4%), Telugu (0.3%), Mundari 0.3%), Bhojpuri (0.1%), Kortha/ Khotta (0.1%) and Koda/ Kora (0.1%). The proportion of Bengali speakers has increased from 72.2% in 1961 to 82.2% to 2001 and that of Santali has increased from 9.3% in 1961 to 10.3% in 2001, but the proportion of Hindi speakers has declined from 5.4% in 1961 to 1.8% in 2001. Information about mother-tongue is available only at the district level and above.

Religion in Tapan CD block (2011)
Hinduism	69.16%
Islam	28.39%
Christianity	1.82%
Sarna	0.43%
Other or not stated	0.20%

As per 2014 District Statistical Handbook: Dakshin Dinajpur (quoting census figures), in the 2001 census, in Tapan CD Block, Hindus numbered 159,060 and formed 70.34% of the population. Muslims numbered 61,760 and formed 27.31% of the population. Christians numbered 4,027 and formed 1.78% of the population. Others numbered 1,289 and formed 0.57% of the population. In the 2011 census, 173,255 (50.19%) were Hindus and 71,109 (49.00%) Muslims, while 4,554 were Christian.

According to the 2011 District Census Handbook: Dakshin Dinajpur, during 2011 census, majority of the population of the district were Hindus constituting 73.5% of the population followed by Muslims with 24.6% of the population. The proportion of Hindu population of the district increased from 59.9% in 1961 to 74.0 %in 2001 and then dropped to 73.5% in 2011. The proportion of Muslim population in the district decreased from 39.4% in 1961 to 24.0% in 2001 and then increased to 24.6% in 2011.

Languages of Tapan CD block (2011)
1. Bengali (79.7%)
2. Santali (10.8%)
3. Kurukh (4.77%)
4. Sadri (2.43%)
5. Others (2.24%)

At the time of the 2011 census, 79.74% of the population spoke Bengali, 10.82% Santali, 4.77% Kurukh and 2.43% Sadri as their first language.

== Rural poverty ==
As per the Human Development Report 2004 for West Bengal, the rural poverty ratio in erstwhile West Dinajpur district was 27.61%. Malda district on the south of West Dinajpur district had a rural poverty ratio of 35.4% and Jalpaiguri district on the north had a rural poverty ratio of 35.73%. These estimates were based on Central Sample data of NSS 55th round 1999-2000.

As per BPL Survey by the Government of West Bengal, the proportion of BPL families in Dakshin Dinajpur district was 43.54% as on 30 October 2002.

== Economy ==
=== Livelihood ===
Livelihood
in Tapan CD Block
1. Cultivators (33.1%)
2. Agricultural labourers (49.8%)
3. Household industries (2.77%)
4. Other Workers (14.3%)

In Tapan CD Block in 2011, amongst the class of total workers, cultivators numbered 37,894 and formed 33.15%, agricultural labourers numbered 56,888 and formed 49.76%, household industry workers numbered 3,165 and formed 2.77% and other workers numbered 16,370 and formed 14.32%. Total workers numbered 114,317 and formed 45.63% of the total population, and non-workers numbered 136,107 and formed 54.37% of the population.

Note: In the census records a person is considered a cultivator, if the person is engaged in cultivation/ supervision of land owned by self/government/institution. When a person who works on another person’s land for wages in cash or kind or share, is regarded as an agricultural labourer. Household industry is defined as an industry conducted by one or more members of the family within the household or village, and one that does not qualify for registration as a factory under the Factories Act. Other workers are persons engaged in some economic activity other than cultivators, agricultural labourers and household workers. It includes factory, mining, plantation, transport and office workers, those engaged in business and commerce, teachers, entertainment artistes and so on.

=== Infrastructure ===
There are 271 inhabited villages in Tapan CD Block. All 271 villages (100%) have power supply. 269 villages (99.26%) have drinking water supply. 51 villages (18.82%) have post offices. 210 villages (77.49%) have telephones (including landlines, public call offices and mobile phones). 131 villages (51.29%) have a pucca (paved) approach road and 89 villages (32.84%) have transport communication (includes bus service, rail facility and navigable waterways). 15 villages (5.54%) have agricultural credit societies. 22 villages (8.12%) have banks.

=== Agriculture ===
The land is fertile for agricultural production, particularly in the southern part of the district. The rivers are flood-prone but droughts also occur occasionally. There are numerous tanks and some marshes and bils. Multiple cropping is widely practised. The Tebhaga movement by the share croppers, towards the end of British rule, is widely known. There are some forests, mostly in areas bordering Bangladesh.

Tapan CD Block had 287 fertiliser depots, 44 seed stores and 50 fair price shops in 2013-14.

In 2013-14, Tapan CD Block produced 121,683 tonnes of Aman paddy, the main winter crop from 42,978 hectares, 9,416 tonnes of Boro paddy (spring crop) from 2,443 hectares, 329 tonnes of Aus paddy (summer crop) from 176 hectares, 1,450 tonnes of wheat from 542 hectares, 17,560 tonnes of jute from 1,110 hectares and 4,378 tonnes of potatoes from 198 hectares. It also produced pulses and oilseeds.

In 2013-14, the total area irrigated in Tapan CD Block was 9,234 hectares, out of which 3,791 hectares were irrigated by tank irrigation, 5,027 hectares by river lift irrigation, 84 hectares by deep tube wells and 332 hectares by shallow tube wells.

=== Banking ===
In 2013-14, Tapan CD Block had offices of 6 commercial banks and 4 gramin banks.

=== Backward Regions Grant Fund ===
Dakshin Dinajpur district is listed as a backward region and receives financial support from the Backward Regions Grant Fund. The fund, created by the Government of India, is designed to redress regional imbalances in development. As of 2012, 272 districts across the country were listed under this scheme. The list includes 11 districts of West Bengal.

== Transport ==
Tapan CD Block has 17 ferry services and 7 originating/ terminating bus routes. The nearest railway station is 15 km from the CD Block headquarters.

The Eklakhi–Balurghat branch line passes through this CD Block and there is a station at Malancha.

State Highway 10 passes through this block.

== Education ==
In 2013-14, Tapan CD Block had 202 primary schools with 15,206 students, 21 middle school with 3,019 students, 10 high schools with 18,437 students and 9 higher secondary schools with 18,137 students. Tapan CD Block had 1 general degree college with 137 students and 714 institutions for special and non-formal education with 19,028 students.

In Tapan CD Block, amongst the 271 inhabited villages, 49 villages do not have a school, 39 villages have more than 1 primary school, 47 villages have at least 1 primary and 1 middle school and 23 villages have at least 1 middle and 1 secondary school.

Nathaniyal Murmu Memorial College was established at Tapan in 2011.

== Healthcare ==
In 2014, Tapan CD Block had 1 rural hospital and 3 primary health centres with total 48 beds and 6 doctors (excluding private bodies). It had 44 family welfare subcentres. 9,027 patients were treated indoor and 276,806 patients were treated outdoor in the hospitals, health centres and subcentres of the CD Block.

Tapan Rural Hospital at Tapan (with 30 beds) is the main medical facility in Tapan CD Block. There are primary health centres at Monahali (with 10 beds), Chenchra (Rampara (Chenchra) PHC) (with 10 beds) and Balapur (Malancha PHC) (with 10 beds).
