= Balurghat Law College =

Law college in West Bengal, India

- Type: Public, Law college
- Established: 2001; 25 years ago
- Affiliations: University of Gour Banga
- Location: Balurghat, Dakshin Dinajpur, West Bengal, 733103, India; 25°14′14.22″N 88°46′51.14″E
- Website: balurghatlawcollege.ac.in
- Location within West Bengal Location within India

Balurghat Law College is a law college in Balurghat, Dakshin Dinajpur, West Bengal. It was established in the year 2001. It is the only law college in the entire district and its neighboring district of Maldah. The college is affiliated to University of Gour Banga. This college is also approved by the Bar Council of India.

== Courses ==
The college offers a five-year integrated B.A. LL.B. (Hons.) course.

== Controversies ==
In December 2016, Durjay Deb, the teacher-in-charge of the college, resigned after a two-hour protest by the TMCP. They accused him for not forwarding the applications for the revaluation of examination papers of 27 students. But Deb denied the allegations and filed a police complaint, stating that he had been forced to resign.

In March 2023, rival factions of the TMCP clashed within the college premises over the institution's management. In July 2025, a video circulated on social media, showing a student being dragged by another student at the college premises. The college's teacher-in-charge, Santosh Kumar Tewari, stated that the incident had not taken place inside the campus.

In June 2026, the college authorities issued a show-cause notice to their assistant librarian because she submitted a fake qualification certificate while joining in 2024. In response to an RTI, William Carey University stated that they had not issued a certificate with the number cited by the assistant librarian.

== See also ==
- List of institutions of higher education in West Bengal
- Education in India
- Education in West Bengal
- List of law schools in India
