= Kumarganj =

- Community development block
- Coordinates: 25.43379°N 88.72671°E
- Country: India
- State: West Bengal
- District: Dakshin Dinajpur

Government
  - Type: Community development block

Area
  - Total: 286.90 km^{2} (110.77 sq mi)

Population (2011)
  - Total: 169,102
  - Density: 589.41/km^{2} (1,526.6/sq mi)

Languages
  - Official: Bengali, English, Santali
- Time zone: UTC+5:30 (IST)
- Lok Sabha constituency: Balurghat
- Vidhan Sabha constituency: Kumarganj
- Website: ddinajpur.nic.in

Kumarganj is a community development block that forms an administrative division in Balurghat subdivision of Dakshin Dinajpur district in the Indian state of West Bengal.

== History ==
Dinajpur district was constituted in 1786. In 1947, the Radcliffe Line placed the Sadar and Thakurgaon subdivisions of Dinajpur district in East Pakistan. The Balurghat subdivision of Dinajpur district was reconstituted as West Dinajpur district in West Bengal. The new Raiganj subdivision was formed in 1948. In order to restore territorial links between northern and southern parts of West Bengal which had been snapped during the partition of Bengal, and on the recommendations of the States Reorganisation Commission a portion of the erstwhile Kishanganj subdivision comprising Goalpokhar, Islampur and Chopra thanas (police stations) and parts of Thakurganj thana, along with the adjacent parts of the erstwhile Gopalpur thana in Katihar subdivision were transferred from Purnea district in Bihar to West Bengal in 1956, and were formally incorporated into Raiganj subdivision in West Dinajpur. The township of Kishanganj and its entire municipal boundary remained within Bihar. With the introduction of the Community Development Programme in 1960-61, community development blocks were set up in West Dinajpur district. In 1992, West Dinajpur district was bifurcated and Dakshin Dinajpur district was established.

== Geography ==
Kumarganj is located at 25°26′02″N 88°43′36″E.

Dakshin Dinajpur district is physiographically a part of the Barind Tract. The area is generally flat and slightly undulating. The elevation of the district is about 15 metres above mean sea level. However, the soil varies. CD Blocks such as Balurghat, Hili and Kumarganj have alluvial soil, Tapan CD Block has laterite soil. There are three main rivers. The Atreyee comes from Bangladesh, flows through Kumarganj and Balurghat CD Blocks and goes back to Bangladesh. The Punarbhaba flows through Gangarampur and Tapan CD Blocks. The Tangon flows through Kushmandi and Bansihari CD Blocks. There is a small river named Jamuna in the Hili CD Block. All rivers, flowing from north to south, overflow during the monsoons and cause floods.

Kumarganj is bounded by Dinajpur Sadar and Chirirbandar Upazilas in Dinajpur District in Bangladesh, on the north, Fulbari and Birampur Upazilas in Dinajpur District in Bangladesh, on the east, Balurghat CD Block on the south, and Tapan and Gangarampur CD Blocks on the west.

Six out of the eight CD Blocks in the district are on the India-Bangladesh border popularly referred to as a porous border. 2,216 km of the 4,096 km long India-Bangladesh border falls in West Bengal. More than 11,000 people live near/ around the zero line in Dakshin Dinajpur. Approximately 252 km of the international border is in Dakshin Dinajpur district.

Kumarganj CD Block has an area of 286.62 km^{2}.It has 1 panchayat samity, 8 gram panchayats, 118 gram sansads (village councils), 218 mouzas and 208 inhabited villages. Kumarganj police station serves this block. Headquarters of this CD Block is at Kumarganj.

Gram panchayats of Kumarganj block/ panchayat samiti are: Batun, Bhour, Deor, Jakirpur, Mohana, Ramkrisnapur, Safanagar and Samjhia.

== Demographics ==
=== Population ===
As per 2011 Census of India, Kumarganj CD Block had a total population of 169,102, all of which were rural. There were 87,098 (52%) males and 82,004 (48%) females. Population below 6 years was 18,773. Scheduled Castes numbered 43,840 (25.93%) and Scheduled Tribes numbered 28,769 (17.01%).

As per 2001 census Kumarganj block had a population of 153,042 of which 78,646 are males and 74,396 are females.

Villages in Kumarganj CD Block included (2011 population in brackets): Bhour (2,456), Dior (3,504), Mohana (1,122), Batun (3,255), Safa Nagar (3,242), Jakhirpur (3,004), Samjia (1,861) and Kumarganj (3,920).

Decadal growth of population in Kumarganj CD Block for the period 2001-2011 was 10.49%. Decadal growth of population in Dakhin Dinajpur district during the same period was 11.52% down from 22.15% in the previous decade. Decadal growth of population in West Bengal for the corresponding periods was 13.93% and 17.77% respectively.

The large scale migration of the East Bengali refugees (including tribals) started with the partition of Bengal in 1947. Up to around 1951, two-fifths of the refugees settled in South Bengal, the balance settled in the North Bengal districts of West Dinajpur, Jalpaiguri and Cooch Behar. Erstwhile West Dinajpur alone received around 6.5% of the early entrants. The steady flow of people into Dakshin Dinajpur has continued over the years from erstwhile East Pakistan and subsequently from Bangladesh.

=== Literacy ===
As per the 2011 census, the total number of literates in Kumarganj CD Block was 112,095 (74.57% of the population over 6 years) out of which males numbered 63,643 (81.76% of the male population over 6 years) and females numbered 51,452 (70.63% of the female population over 6 years). The gender disparity (the difference between female and male literacy rates) was 11.14%.

See also – List of West Bengal districts ranked by literacy rate

Literacy in CD blocks of
Dakshin Dinajpur district
Balurghat subdivision
Balurghat – 73.96%
Hili – 76.04%
Kumarganj – 74.57%
Tapan – 68.62%
Gangrampur subdivision
Bansihari – 68.79%
Gangarampur – 71.45%
Harirampur – 64.67%
Kushmandi – 65.43%
Source: 2011 Census: CD Block Wise
Primary Census Abstract Data

=== Language and religion ===
Religion in Kumarganj CD block (2011)
Hinduism	64.23%
Islam	34.13%
Christianity	1.32%
Other or not stated	0.32%

As per 2014 District Statistical Handbook: Dakshin Dinajpur (quoting census figures), in the 2001 census, in Kumarganj CD Block, Hindus numbered 99,308 and formed 64.89% of the population. Muslims numbered 49,982 and formed 32.66% of the population. Christians numbered 2,127 and formed 1.39% of the population. Others numbered 1,625 and formed 0.70% of the population. In the 2011 census, 108,610 (64.23%) were Hindus and 57,718 (34.13%) Muslims, while 2,226 were Christian.

According to the 2011 District Census Handbook: Dakshin Dinajpur, during 2011 census, majority of the population of the district were Hindus constituting 73.5% of the population followed by Muslims with 24.6% of the population. The proportion of Hindu population of the district increased from 59.9% in 1961 to 74.0 %in 2001 and then dropped to 73.5% in 2011. The proportion of Muslim population in the district decreased from 39.4% in 1961 to 24.0% in 2001 and then increased to 24.6% in 2011.

Languages of Kumarganj CD block (2011)
1. Bengali (83.7%)
2. Santali (13.6%)
3. Others (2.74%)

At the time of the 2011 census, 83.70% of the population spoke Bengali and 13.56% Santali as their first language.

== Rural poverty ==
As per the Human Development Report 2004 for West Bengal, the rural poverty ratio in erstwhile West Dinajpur district was 27.61%. Malda district on the south of West Dinajpur district had a rural poverty ratio of 35.4% and Jalpaiguri district on the north had a rural poverty ratio of 35.73%. These estimates were based on Central Sample data of NSS 55th round 1999-2000.

As per BPL Survey by the Government of West Bengal, the proportion of BPL families in Dakshin Dinajpur district was 43.54% as on 30 October 2002.

== Economy ==
=== Livelihood ===
Livelihood
in Kumarganj CD Block
1. Cultivators (30.7%)
2. Agricultural labourers (48.7%)
3. Household industries (4.93%)
4. Other Workers (15.7%)

In Kumarganj CD Block in 2011, amongst the class of total workers, cultivators numbered 22,295 and formed 30.68%, agricultural labourers numbered 23,272 and formed 48.66%, household industry workers numbered 3,584 and formed 4.93% and other workers numbered 11,436 and formed 15.74%. Total workers numbered 72,676 and formed 42.98% of the total population, and non-workers numbered 96,426 and formed 57.02% of the population.

Note: In the census records a person is considered a cultivator, if the person is engaged in cultivation/ supervision of land owned by self/government/institution. When a person who works on another person’s land for wages in cash or kind or share, is regarded as an agricultural labourer. Household industry is defined as an industry conducted by one or more members of the family within the household or village, and one that does not qualify for registration as a factory under the Factories Act. Other workers are persons engaged in some economic activity other than cultivators, agricultural labourers and household workers. It includes factory, mining, plantation, transport and office workers, those engaged in business and commerce, teachers, entertainment artistes and so on.

=== Infrastructure ===
There are 208 inhabited villages in Kumarganj CD Block. All 208 villages (100%) have power supply. 208 villages (100%) have drinking water supply. 24 villages (11.54%) have post offices. 204 villages (98.08%) have telephones (including landlines, public call offices and mobile phones). 102 villages (49.04%) have a pucca (paved) approach road and 83 villages (39.90%) have transport communication (includes bus service, rail facility and navigable waterways). 4 villages (1.92%) have agricultural credit societies. 11 villages (5.29%) have banks.

=== Agriculture ===
The land is fertile for agricultural production, particularly in the southern part of the district. The rivers are flood-prone but droughts also occur occasionally. There are numerous tanks and some marshes and bils. Multiple cropping is widely practised. The Tebhaga movement by the share croppers, towards the end of British rule, is widely known. There are some forests, mostly in areas bordering Bangladesh.

Kumarganj CD Block had 192 fertiliser depots, 18 seed stores and 32 fair price shops in 2013-14.

In 2013-14, Kumarganj CD Block produced 4,178 tonnes of Aman paddy, the main winter crop from 1,741 hectares, 5,579 tonnes of Boro paddy (spring crop) from 1,794 hectares, 818 tonnes of Aus paddy (summer crop) from 447 hectares, 2,053 tonnes of wheat from 807 hectares, 49,773 tonnes of jute from 3,305 hectares and 6,036 tonnes of potatoes from 275 hectares. It also produced pulses and oilseeds.

In 2013-14, the total area irrigated in Kumarganj CD Block was 9,620 hectares, out of which 841 hectares were irrigated by tank irrigation, 6,440 hectares by river lift irrigation, 603 hectares by deep tube wells and 1,736 hectares by shallow tube wells.

=== Banking ===
In 2013-14, Kumarganj CD Block had offices of 4 commercial banks and 2 gramin banks.

=== Backward Regions Grant Fund ===
Dakshin Dinajpur district is listed as a backward region and receives financial support from the Backward Regions Grant Fund. The fund, created by the Government of India, is designed to redress regional imbalances in development. As of 2012, 272 districts across the country were listed under this scheme. The list includes 11 districts of West Bengal.

== Transport ==
Kumarganj CD Block has 7 ferry services and 8 originating/ terminating bus routes. The nearest railway station is 27 km from the CD Block headquarters.

== Education ==
In 2013-14, Kumarganj CD Block had 139 primary schools with 9,899 students, 7 middle schools with 5,444 students, 17 high schools with 15,350 students and 12 higher secondary schools with 12,804 students. Kumarganj CD Block had 331 institutions for special and non-formal education with 10,907 students.

In Kumarganj CD Block, amongst the 208 inhabited villages, 52 villages do not have a school, 38 villages have more than 1 primary school, 32 villages have at least 1 primary and 1 middle school and 24 villages have at least 1 middle and 1 secondary school.

Kumarganj College was established at Kumarganj in 2016.

== Healthcare ==
In 2014, Kumarganj CD Block had 1 rural hospital and 3 primary health centres with total 48 beds and 6 doctors (excluding private bodies). It had 34 family welfare subcentres. 5,238 patients were treated indoor and 275,150 patients were treated outdoor in the hospitals, health centres and subcentres of the CD Block.

Kumarganj Rural Hospital at Kumarganj (with 30 beds) is the main medical facility in Kumarganj CD Block. There are primary health centres at Penitora (Samjia PHC) (with 10 beds), Bathur (with 10 beds) and Deor (with 10 beds).
