= Buniadpur =

- City
- Location in West Bengal, India Buniadpur (India)
- Coordinates: 25.39°N 88.39°E
- Country: India
- State: West Bengal
- District: Dakshin Dinajpur

Government
  - Type: Municipality
  - Body: Buniadpur Municipality
  - Chairperson: Kamal Sarkar (AITC)
  - District Magistrate: Shri Bijin Krishna (IAS)

Area
  - Total: 24.49 km^{2} (9.46 sq mi)
  - Rank: 3rd largest city in Dakshin Dinajpur

Population (2011)
  - Total: 31,964
  - Density: 1,305/km^{2} (3,380/sq mi)

Languages
  - Official: Bengali, English
- Time zone: UTC+5:30 (IST)
- PIN: 733121
- Telephone Code: 03524
- Vehicle registration: WB-61/WB-62
- Website: ddinajpur.nic.in buniadpurmunicipality.org

Buniadpur is a city and a municipality in North Bengal in the Dakshin Dinajpur district, West Bengal, India.

== Geography ==
Town in the Dakshin Dinajpur district
M: municipal Village, CT: census town, R: rural/ urban centre, H: historical site
Owing to space constraints in the small map, the actual locations in a larger map may vary slightly.

== Location ==
The municipality is located at the coordinates 25.39°N 88.39°E. It is divided into 14 wards.

In the map alongside, all places marked on the map are linked in the full screen version.

== Demographics ==
Buniadpur Municipality has a total population of 31964.

== Administrator ==
The first election results of the 14 wards of Buniadpur Municipality were declared. The ruling Trinamool Congress (TMC) won 13 out of 14 wards. Polling was held on 13 August 2017. The municipality is in Dakshin Dinajpur district of West Bengal. Civic elections took place for the first time in Buniadpur Municipality as the civic body was formed in 2014. Both the TMC and BJP contested polls in all the 14 wards, whereas the CPI(M) fielded candidates in 12 wards. 86.89% of the voters exercised their franchise in the elections. Several incidents of violence and booth capturing were reported during the polling.

== Transport ==
Buniadpur Railway Station serves as rail transportation system for Buniadpur.

Buniadpur Bus Stand serves as bus transportation system. Buses go to Kolkata, Siliguri, Alipurduar, Jalpaiguri, Coochbehar, and Malda.

New broad gauge lines – Gazole-Itahar (27.20 km), Itahar-Raiganj (22.16 km) and Itahar-Buniadpur (27.095 km) – as a material modification of the Eklakhi-Balurghat project (commissioned in 2004) were included in the budget of 1983-84. Initial work for the lines was taken up by Northeast Frontier Railway. 431.973 ha of land to be acquired. Land acquisition commenced in the Gazole-Itahar sector with initial fund sanctions. As of August 2018, further sanctions were awaited.

A new broad gauge line from Kaliaganj to Buniadpur (33.10 km) was included in the budget of 2010-11. 157.938 ha of land to be acquired. As of August 2018, project work by Northeast Frontier Railway was held up mainly because of paucity of funds.

== Education ==
Buniadpur Mahavidyalaya is a college located in Buniadpur, affiliated to University of Gour Banga.

Banshihari High School is a renowned school located in Buniadpur Municipality which was established in 1952. Banshihari Balika Vidyalay is also located in Buniadpur. Narayanpur High School and the new Buniadpur High School are also in Buniadpur.

Buniadpur Teachers Training College (D.El.Ed, B.ED), Buniadpur Government Girls ITI, and Ujjwal Kids World are also situated in Buniadpur.
