= Tapan, Dakshin Dinajpur =

Tapan
- Village
- Location in West Bengal, India Tapan (India)
- Coordinates: 25.30863°N 88.566439°E
- Country: India
- State: West Bengal
- District: Dakshin Dinajpur

Population (2011)
  - Total: 2,796

Languages
  - Official: Bengali, English
- Time zone: UTC+5:30 (IST)
- PIN: 733127
- STD/ Telephone code: 03521
- Lok Sabha constituency: Balurghat
- Vidhan Sabha constituency: Tapan
- Website: ddinajpur.nic.in

Tapan is a village in Tapan CD Block in Balurghat subdivision of Dakshin Dinajpur district in the state of West Bengal, India.

== Geography ==
Cities and towns in the Dakshin Dinajpur district
M: municipal city/ town, CT: census town, R: rural/ urban centre, H: historical site
Owing to space constraints in the small map, the actual locations in a larger map may vary slightly

=== Location ===
Tapan is located at 25.30863°N 88.566439°E.

In the map alongside, all places marked on the map are linked in the full screen version.

=== Police station ===
Tapan police station under West Bengal police has jurisdiction over Tapan CD Block.

=== CD Block HQ ===
The headquarters of Tapan CD Block is at Tapan.

== Demographics ==
As per the 2011 Census of India, Tapan had a total population of 2,796, of which 1,451 (52%) were males and 1,345 (48%) were females. Population below 6 years was 256. The total number of literates in Tapan was 2,105 (82.87% of the population over 6 years).

== Education ==
Nathaniyal Murmu Memorial College was established at Tapan in 2011. Affiliated to the Gour Banga University, it offers honours courses in English, Bengali, history and education, and a general course in arts.

== Healthcare ==
Tapan Rural Hospital at Tapan (with 30 beds) is the main medical facility in Tapan CD Block. There are primary health centres at Monahali (with 10 beds), Chenchra (Rampara (Chenchra) PHC) (with 10 beds) and Balapur (Malancha PHC) (with 10 beds).
