= Tapan Assembly constituency =

Tapan
- Constituency No. 40 for the West Bengal Legislative Assembly
- Interactive Map Outlining Tapan Assembly Constituency

Constituency details
- Country: India
- Region: East India
- State: West Bengal
- District: Dakshin Dinajpur
- Lok Sabha constituency: Balurghat
- Established: 1962
- Total electors: 220,236
- Reservation: ST

Member of Legislative Assembly
- 18th West Bengal Legislative Assembly
- Incumbent Budhrai Tudu
- Party: BJP
- Alliance: NDA
- Elected year: 2026

Tapan Assembly constituency is an assembly constituency in Dakshin Dinajpur district in the Indian state of West Bengal. It is reserved for scheduled tribes.

== Overview ==
As per orders of the Delimitation Commission, No. 40 Tapan Assembly constituency (ST) covers Dwip Khanda, Gophanagar, Harsura, Malancha and Tapan Chandipur gram panchayats of Tapan community development block, and Boaldar, Chak Vrigu, Jalghar, Bolla, Danga, Gopalbati, Najirpur and Patiram gram panchayats of Balurghat community development block,

Tapan Assembly constituency (ST) is part of No. 6 Balurghat (Lok Sabha constituency).

== Members of the Legislative Assembly ==
Year	Member	Party
1962	Nathaniel Murmu	Revolutionary Socialist Party
1967	Nathaniel Murmu	Revolutionary Socialist Party
1969	Nathaniel Murmu	Revolutionary Socialist Party
1971	Patrash Hembram	Indian National Congress
1972	Patrash Hembram	Indian National Congress
1977	Nathaniel Murmu	Revolutionary Socialist Party
1982	Khara Soren	Revolutionary Socialist Party
1987	Khara Soren	Revolutionary Socialist Party
1991	Khara Soren	Revolutionary Socialist Party
1996	Khara Soren	Revolutionary Socialist Party
2001	Khara Soren	Revolutionary Socialist Party
2006	Khara Soren	Revolutionary Socialist Party
2011	Bachchu Hansda	Trinamool Congress
2016	Bachchu Hansda	Trinamool Congress
2021	Budhrai Tudu	Bharatiya Janata Party
2026	Budhrai Tudu	Bharatiya Janata Party

== Election results ==
Vote share of Winning candidates
2026	56.66%
2021	45.29%
2016	42.78%
2011	51.61%
2006	56.45%
2001	49.34%
1996	53.91%
1991	51.71%
1987	58.99%
1982	54.05%
1977	62.83%
1972	57.97%
1971	42.49%
1969	51.29%
1967	58.04%
1962	52.56%

=== 2026 ===
2026 West Bengal Legislative Assembly election: Tapan
Party	Candidate	Votes	%	±%
BJP	Budhrai Tudu	105,780	56.66	+11.37
AITC	Chintamani Biha	68,793	36.85	−7.56
RSP	Bappai Haro	5,940	3.18	−3.31
INC	BANKIM CHANDRA TOPPO	1,616	0.87	
NOTA	None of the above	1,441	0.77	−0.14
Majority		36,987	19.81	+18.93
Turnout		186,702	95.62	+11.02
BJP hold		Swing		

=== 2021 ===
In the 2021 West Bengal Legislative Assembly election, Budhrai Tudu of BJP defeated his nearest rival, Kalpana Kisku of TMC.

2021 West Bengal Legislative Assembly election: Tapan
Party	Candidate	Votes	%	±%
BJP	Budhrai Tudu	84,381	45.29	+33.19
AITC	Kalpana Kisku	82,731	44.41	
RSP	Raghu Urow	12,088	6.49	−33.7
BSP	Bablu Kisku	2,146	1.15	+0.02
NOTA	None of the above	1,703	0.91	
Majority		1,650	0.88	
Turnout		186,309	84.6	
BJP gain from AITC		Swing		

=== 2016 ===
In the 2016 West Bengal Legislative Assembly election, Bachchu Hansda of TMC defeated his nearest rival Raghu Urow of RSP.

2016 West Bengal Legislative Assembly election: Tapan (ST) constituency
Party	Candidate	Votes	%	±%
AITC	Bachchu Hansda	72,511	42.78	−8.83
RSP	Raghu Urow	68,110	40.19	+1.83
BJP	Krishna Kujur	20,510	12.10	+7.47
NOTA	None of the above	4,101	2.42	
BSP	Bablu Kisku	1,913	1.13	−0.24
SUCI(C)	Kalicharan Ekka	1,298	0.77	
CPI(ML)L	Ram Kisku	1,045	0.62	−0.15
Turnout		169,488	88.84	+3.20
AITC hold		Swing		

=== 2011 ===
2011 West Bengal Legislative Assembly election: Tapan (ST)
Party	Candidate	Votes	%	±%
AITC	Bachchu Hansda	72,643	51.61	
RSP	Khara Soren	53,986	38.36	
BJP	Colombas Tirkey	6,518	4.63	
BSP	Nitai Kisku	1,931	1.37	
JMM	Bajal Soren	1,686	1.20	
Independent	Sobindra Nath Mahato	1,670	1.19	
Independent	Ukil Kujur	1,238	0.88	
CPI(ML)L	Rayman Kisku	1,081	0.77	
Majority		18,657	13.25	
Turnout		140,753	89.68	
AITC gain from RSP		Swing		

=== 2006 ===
2006 West Bengal Legislative Assembly election: Tapan (ST)
Party	Candidate	Votes	%	±%
RSP	Khara Soren	74,003	56.45	
BJP	Columbus Tirki	29,517	22.52	
INC	Lakshiram Hemram	19,050	14.53	
Independent	Munsi Tudu	3,053	2.33	
Independent	Kalidas Tapna	2,680	2.04	
BSP	Matilal Hasda	2,265	1.73	
Majority		44,486	33.93	
Turnout		131,085		
RSP hold		Swing		

=== 2001 ===
2001 West Bengal Legislative Assembly election: Tapan (ST)
Party	Candidate	Votes	%	±%
RSP	Khara Soren	58,892	49.34	
AITC	Antony Uraw	49,993	41.88	
BJP	Panchali Oraon	7,101	5.95	
Independent	Sukumar Ekka	1,865	1.56	
BSP	Matilal Hansda	1,518	1.27	
Majority		8,899	7.46	
Turnout		119,415	82.64	
RSP hold		Swing		

=== 1996 ===
1996 West Bengal Legislative Assembly election: Tapan (ST)
Party	Candidate	Votes	%	±%
RSP	Khara Soren	65,142	53.91	
INC	Lakshmi Ram Hembram	39,745	32.89	
BJP	Panchali Oraon	12,594	10.42	
Independent	Som Nath Hansda	1,591	1.32	
Independent	Sukumar Ekka	812	0.67	
Independent	Nalin Murmu	565	0.47	
Independent	Baharmani Hembram	378	0.31	
Majority		25,397	21.02	
Turnout		123,044	87.37	
RSP hold		Swing		

=== 1991 ===
1991 West Bengal Legislative Assembly election: Tapan (ST)
Party	Candidate	Votes	%	±%
RSP	Khara Soren	56,161	51.71	
INC	Lakshmi Ram Hemram	33,006	30.39	
BJP	Partrash Hemram	17,622	16.22	
JP	Bharati Mardi	746	0.69	
Independent	Mangal Biha	396	0.36	
Independent	Kshitish Chandra Minji	369	0.34	
Independent	Baharmani Hembram	312	0.29	
Majority		23,155	21.32	
Turnout		110,447	82.80	
RSP hold		Swing		

=== 1987 ===
1987 West Bengal Legislative Assembly election: Tapan (ST)
Party	Candidate	Votes	%	±%
RSP	Khara Soren	55,629	58.99	
INC	Japan Bhonajala	36,066	38.24	
BJP	Kisku Bhola	1,862	1.97	
Independent	Hembram Bhola	407	0.43	
Independent	Binay Chandra Paham	346	0.37	
Majority		19,563	20.75	
Turnout		95,659	82.02	
RSP hold		Swing		

=== 1982 ===
1982 West Bengal Legislative Assembly election: Tapan (ST)
Party	Candidate	Votes	%	±%
RSP	Khara Soren	44,826	54.05	
INC	Japan Hasda	36,379	43.86	
Independent	Paresh Hasda	967	1.17	
JP	Mardi Hakai	540	0.65	
Independent	Lakshmi Ram Hembram	229	0.28	
Majority		8,447	10.19	
Turnout		84,439	84.67	
RSP hold		Swing		

=== 1977 ===
1977 West Bengal Legislative Assembly election: Tapan (ST)
Party	Candidate	Votes	%	±%
RSP	Natheniel Murmu	32,660	62.83	
INC	Sebastiam Tudu	13,258	25.50	
JP	Hakai Mardi	5,836	11.23	
Independent	Alphase Kerketa	228	0.44	
Majority		19,402	37.33	
Turnout		52,849	64.77	
RSP gain from INC		Swing		

=== 1972 ===
1972 West Bengal Legislative Assembly election: Tapan (ST)
Party	Candidate	Votes	%	±%
INC	Patrash Hembrem	28,166	57.97	
RSP	Nathanial Murmu	20,035	41.24	
Jharkhand Party	Kisku Gomai	384	0.79	
Majority		8,131	16.73	
Turnout		49,839	68.20	
INC hold		Swing		

=== 1971 ===
1971 West Bengal Legislative Assembly election: Tapan (ST)
Party	Candidate	Votes	%	±%
INC	Patrash Hemram	21,981	42.49	
RSP	Oraon Bandhu	18,456	35.68	
CPI(M)	Dibu Mukmu	7,429	14.36	
CPI	Rabindra Nath Murum	3,103	6.00	
INC(O)	Hakai Mardi	762	1.47	
Majority		3,525	6.81	
Turnout		53,843	74.60	
INC gain from RSP		Swing		

=== 1969 ===
1969 West Bengal Legislative Assembly election: Tapan (ST)
Party	Candidate	Votes	%	±%
RSP	Nathaniel Murmu	22,502	51.29	
INC	Kerkata Hindiram	20,795	47.40	
NDF	Hankai Mardi	573	1.31	
Majority		1,707	3.89	
Turnout		45,174	67.33	
RSP gain from Independent		Swing		

=== 1967 ===
1967 West Bengal Legislative Assembly election: Tapan (ST)
Party	Candidate	Votes	%	±%
Independent	N. Murmu	23,961	58.04	
INC	K. H. Ram	14,926	36.15	
Independent	H. Mardi	2,399	5.81	
Majority		9,035	21.89	
Turnout		44,501	67.68	
Independent gain from RSP		Swing		

=== 1962 ===
1962 West Bengal Legislative Assembly election: Tapan (ST)
Party	Candidate	Votes	%	±%
RSP	Nathaniel Murmu	14,840	52.56	
INC	Hakai Mardi	11,608	41.12	
Independent	Hindiram Kerketa	1,785	6.32	
Majority		3,232	11.44	
Turnout		30,347	49.51	
RSP win (new seat)				
