= University of Gour Banga =

Public university in Malda, West Bengal

- Motto: caraiveti
- Motto in English: Keep Walking
- Type: Public State University
- Established: 10 March 2008 (18 years ago)
- Accreditation: NAAC
- Academic affiliations: UGC; AIU; BCI
- Budget: ₹31.64 crore (US$3.3 million) (2026–27)
- Chancellor: Governor of West Bengal
- Vice-Chancellor: Ashis Bhattacharya
- Academic staff: 88 (2025)
- Students: 2,323 (2025)
- Postgraduates: 1,982 (2025)
- Doctoral students: 341 (2025)
- Location: Malda, West Bengal, India; 24°59′01.40″N 88°08′09.47″E
- Campus: Urban
- Website: www.ugb.ac.in

University of Gour Banga is a public state university located in Malda, West Bengal, India. It is one of the newest state universities established in 2008 by the Government of West Bengal on Act XXVI 2007.

== History ==
The university completed its establishment in 2008 by the Government of West Bengal. At present there are 23 PG departments running with an enrollment of around 2500. 25 General degree colleges with enrollment of 1.50 Lakhs (150.000) in Malda, Uttar Dinajpur and Dakshin Dinajpur districts, with the exception of Raiganj University College, are affiliated with this university. The university is situated on NH 12 (old N.H. 34) near Rabindra Bhavan. The Central Bus Terminus is adjacent to the University campus. The University of Gour Banga (UGB) is established by West Bengal Act XXVI of 2007 and located at English Bazar area of Malda district in West Bengal. It is one of the newest state universities established by the Government of West Bengal to address the concerns of ‘equity and access’ and to increase access to quality higher education for people in less educationally developed districts of Malda, Uttar Dinajpur and Dakshin Dinajpur which have a Graduate Enrolment Ratio of less than the state and national average . The UGB, with its territorial jurisdiction of the entire Malda, Uttar Dinajpur and Dakshin Dinajpur districts initiated its academic activities from the academic year 2008 in keeping with the philosophy of achieving and maintaining the highest levels of academic excellence and meeting the aspiration of the socio-economically backward segments of Muslims, SC and ST which constitute more than 75 percent of the population in its catchment area.

Prof. Surabhi Bandyopadhyay, the former vice-chancellor of Netaji Subhas Open University, became the first vice chancellor of the university, while the former registrar of University of North Bengal, Dr. Tapash Kumar Chattopadhyay, became the first acting registrar, all in 2008. Prof. Gopa Dutta was the second vice chancellor.

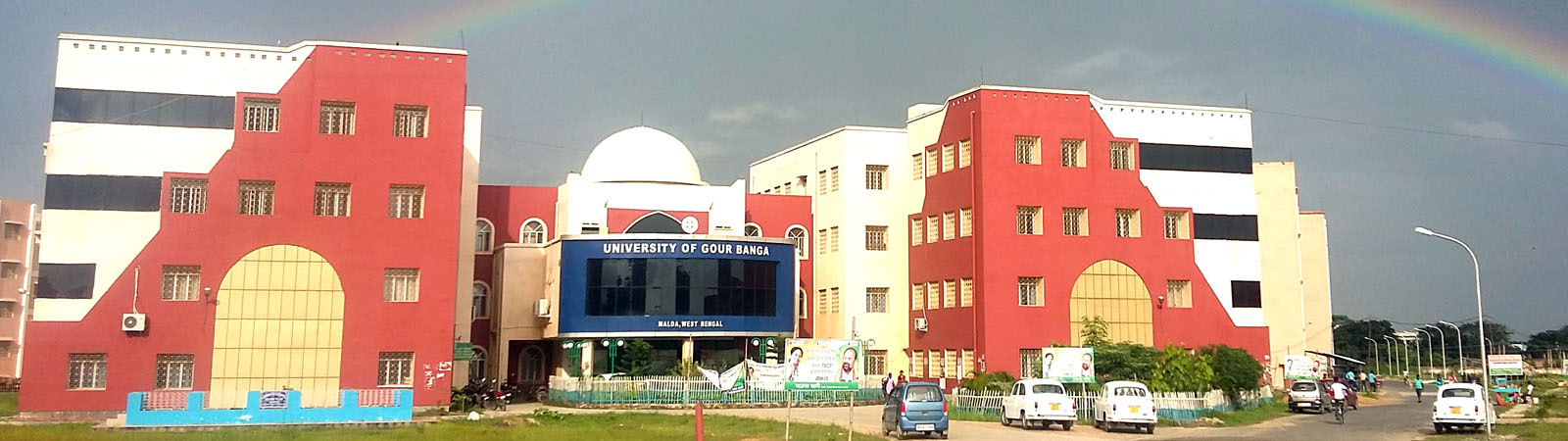
Main Building of UGB

The logo of the University of Gour Banga was prepared in the second week of June 2008 by Sameer Rakshit, the head of the Department of Architecture, Jadavpur University. Rakshit is also in charge of designing the main building of the University of Gour Banga, which started functioning from the ground-floor of the Post-Graduate Section of Malda College in 2008. From 2011 this university is functioning on its own campus which is near Rabindra Bhaban, Malda 732103, West Bengal, India.

The University of Gour Banga recently completed construction of two on-campus hostels, providing residential facilities for 300 students. The ₹9 crore project features separate wings for 150 male and 150 female residents, aiming to improve accessibility for regional scholars.

In 2024, five researchers from the University of Gour Banga were named among the World's top 2% of scientists in a study by Stanford University. Recognized for their significant citation impact and research excellence, the faculty members represent the departments of Physics, Botany, and Zoology. This achievement highlights the institution's growing contribution to global scientific literature and academic research.

The University’s Geography Department recently secured a ₹73 lakh DST-FIST grant from India's Ministry of Science and Technology. This funding aims to enhance research infrastructure, focusing on geoinformatics and laboratory upgrades to support advanced geographical studies in North Bengal.

== Organisation and Administration ==
=== Governance ===
The Vice-chancellor of the University of Gour Banga is the chief executive officer of the university.

Vice-Chancellors
Surabhi Bandyopadhyay	2008 – 2011
Gopa Dutta	2011 – 2012
Achintya Biswas	2012 – 2013
Gopal Chandra Mishra	2014 – 2017
Swagata Sen	2017 – 2019
Chanchal Chaudhuri	2019 – 2021
Shanti Chhetry	2021 – 2023
Rajat Kishor Dey	2023 – 2024
Pabitra Chattopadhyay	2024 – 2025
Ashis Bhattacharjee	2025 – Present

=== Faculties and Departments ===
University of Gour Banga has 23 departments organized into three faculties.

Faculties and Departments
Faculty	Departments
Faculty of Science	Mathematics, Physics, Chemistry, Computer Science, Food & Nutrition, Botany, Zoology, Physiology
Faculty of Humanities, Social Science & Commerce	Bengali, English, Arabic, Sanskrit, History, Geography, Political Science, Philosophy, Economics, Sociology, Commerce
Faculty of Law, Education, Journalism, Library Science, and Physical Education	Education, Library and Information Science, Law, Mass Communication

=== Affiliations ===
The university is an affiliating institution and has its jurisdiction over the colleges of Malda, Uttar Dinajpur and Dakshin Dinajpur districts.

== Academics ==
=== Admission ===
One has to pass the secondary (10+2) examination for admission to undergraduate courses. For admission to postgraduate courses, one has to take an entrance examination after the undergraduate degree.

=== Accreditation ===
In 2016 the university has been awarded a 'B' grade with CGPA value 2.30 by the National Assessment and Accreditation Council

=== Academic partnerships ===
The University of Gour Banga and Karnataka Samskrit University entered a MoU on April 22, 2017. This academic partnership facilitates faculty and student exchanges, joint research projects, and collaborative seminars to promote Sanskrit and regional scholarship.

== Research contribution ==
Researchers from Saaii College and the University of Gour Banga demonstrated that ethanol-based tinctures of Cannabis sativa, Thuja orientalis, and Psidium guajava exhibit significant antibacterial activity against methicillin-resistant Staphylococcus aureus (MRSA), offering potential alternatives for multi-drug resistant pathogen management.

Researchers at the University of Gour Banga identified 5-butyl-2-pyridine carboxylic acid from Aspergillus fumigatus nHF-01. This stable antimicrobial exhibits broad-spectrum efficacy against human pathogens by disrupting cell membranes, offering a promising secondary metabolite for pharmaceutical development against antibiotic-resistant bacteria.

Researchers from the Gour Banga University and University of Calcutta developed a pH-responsive nanocarrier to deliver Parthenolide for Triple-Negative Breast Cancer treatment. This targeted system selectively induces apoptosis in malignant cells and inhibits metastasis, offering a potential therapeutic strategy with minimal toxicity.

== Notable alumni ==
- Subodh Sarkar

== See also ==
- List of universities in India
- University of Calcutta
- University of North Bengal
- Jadavpur University
- Jawaharlal Nehru University
- Jamia Millia Islamia
- Education in India
- Education in West Bengal
