= Atrai River =

Coordinates: 25°14′48″N 88°46′32″E

Atrai River Atreyee River
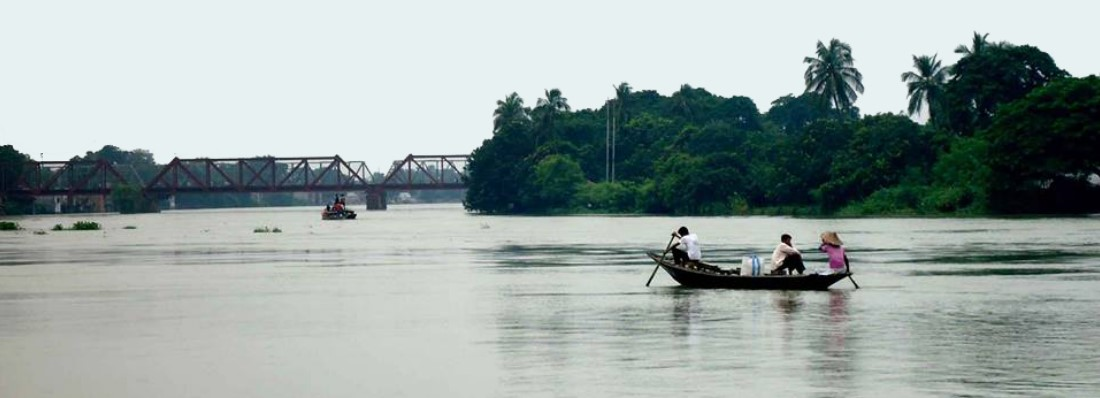
- Atrai river during monsoon, a view from Atrai Upazila, Naogaon District, Bangladesh

Location
- Countries: India and Bangladesh
- State: West Bengal

Physical characteristics
- Source: Jorapani river
  - location: near Baikanthapur forest, Ward No 40, Siliguri, West Bengal, India
- Mouth: Chalan Beel
- Length: 390 km (240 mi)
- Discharge
  - location: Chalan Beel

Atrai River (also spelt as Atreyee) (Bengali: আত্রাই/আত্রেয়ী নদী, romanized: ātrāi/ātrēẏī nadī) flows in West Bengal in India and northern parts of Bangladesh.

In ancient times the river was called Atreyee and finds a mention in the Mahabharata, one of the two Sanskrit epics of ancient India. It is linked with Jorapani river, Fuleswari river, and Karatoya River. The Atrai originates in Siliguri ward no 40, near Baikanthapur forest of West Bengal and after flowing through Dinajpur District of Bangladesh, it enters India again. It passes through Kumarganj and Balurghat community development blocks in Dakshin Dinajpur district. The river then renters Bangladesh. It splits into two rivers—the Gabura and the Kankra in Dinajpur district. It crosses the Barind Tract and flows into Chalan Beel. The river serves as a perennial source of fishing, even though it is often the cause of flooding in many areas during monsoons.

The total length of this river is approximately 240 miles (390 km) and its maximum depth is 99 feet (30 m).
