= Dakshin Dinajpur district =

District in West Bengal, India

- District of West Bengal
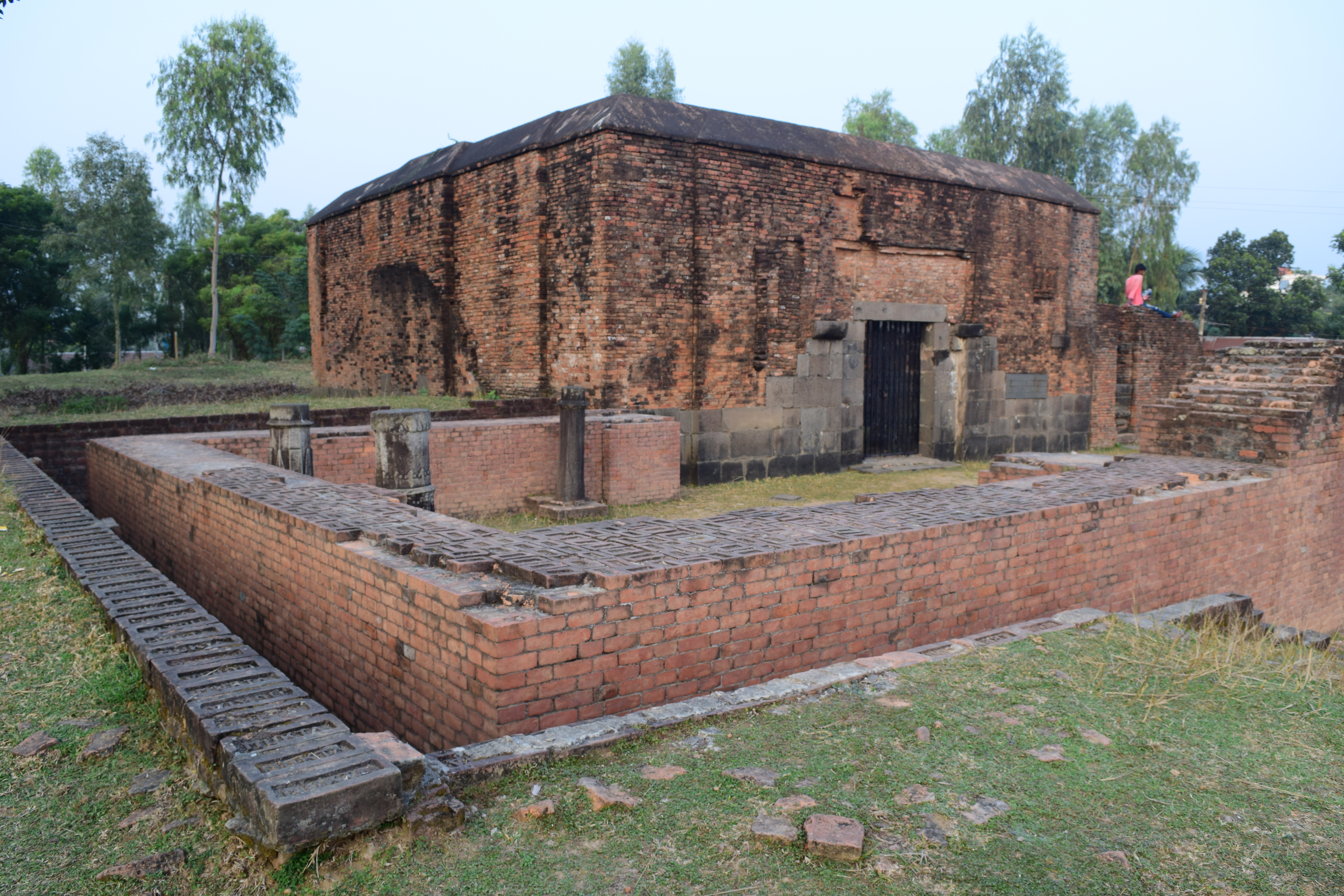
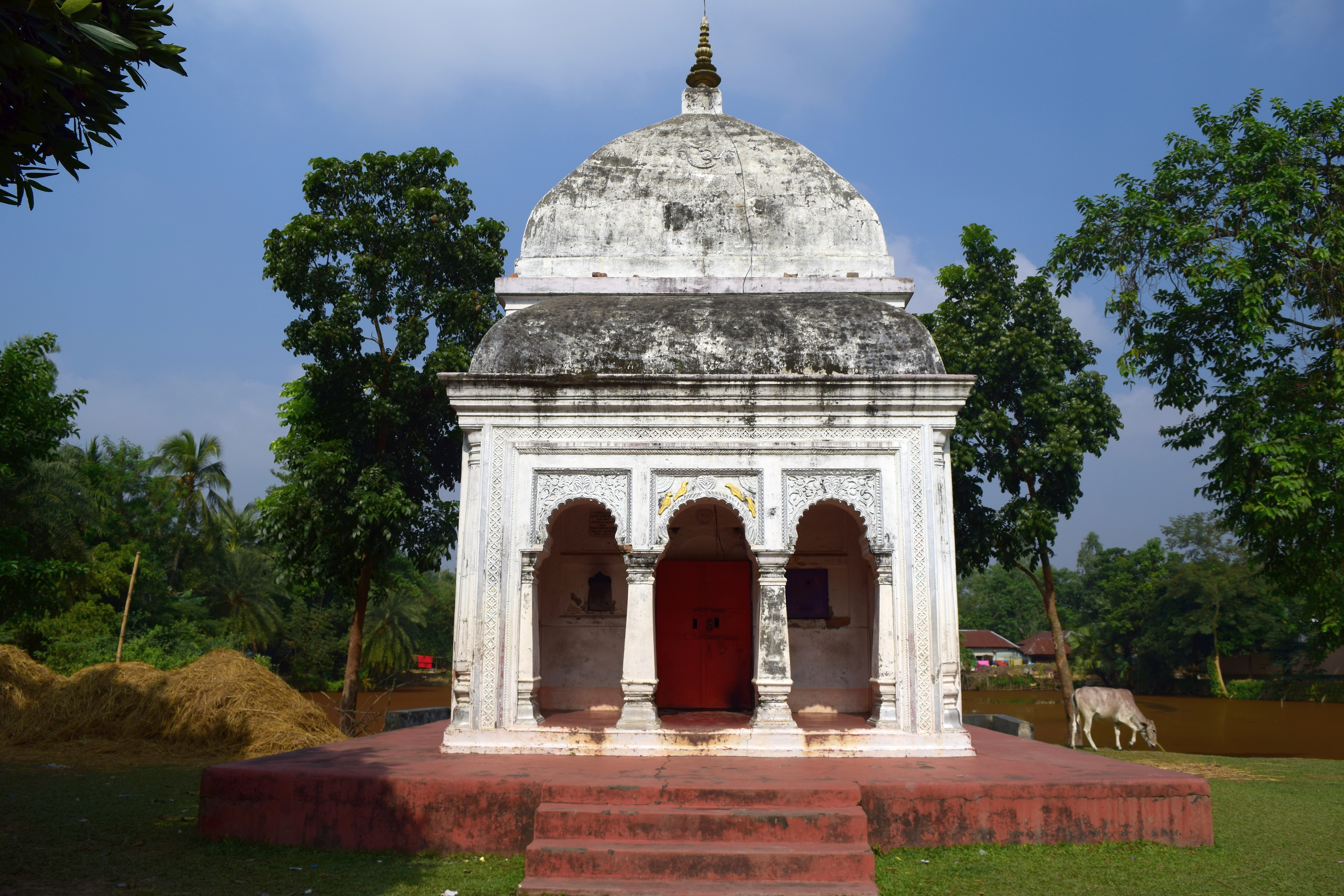
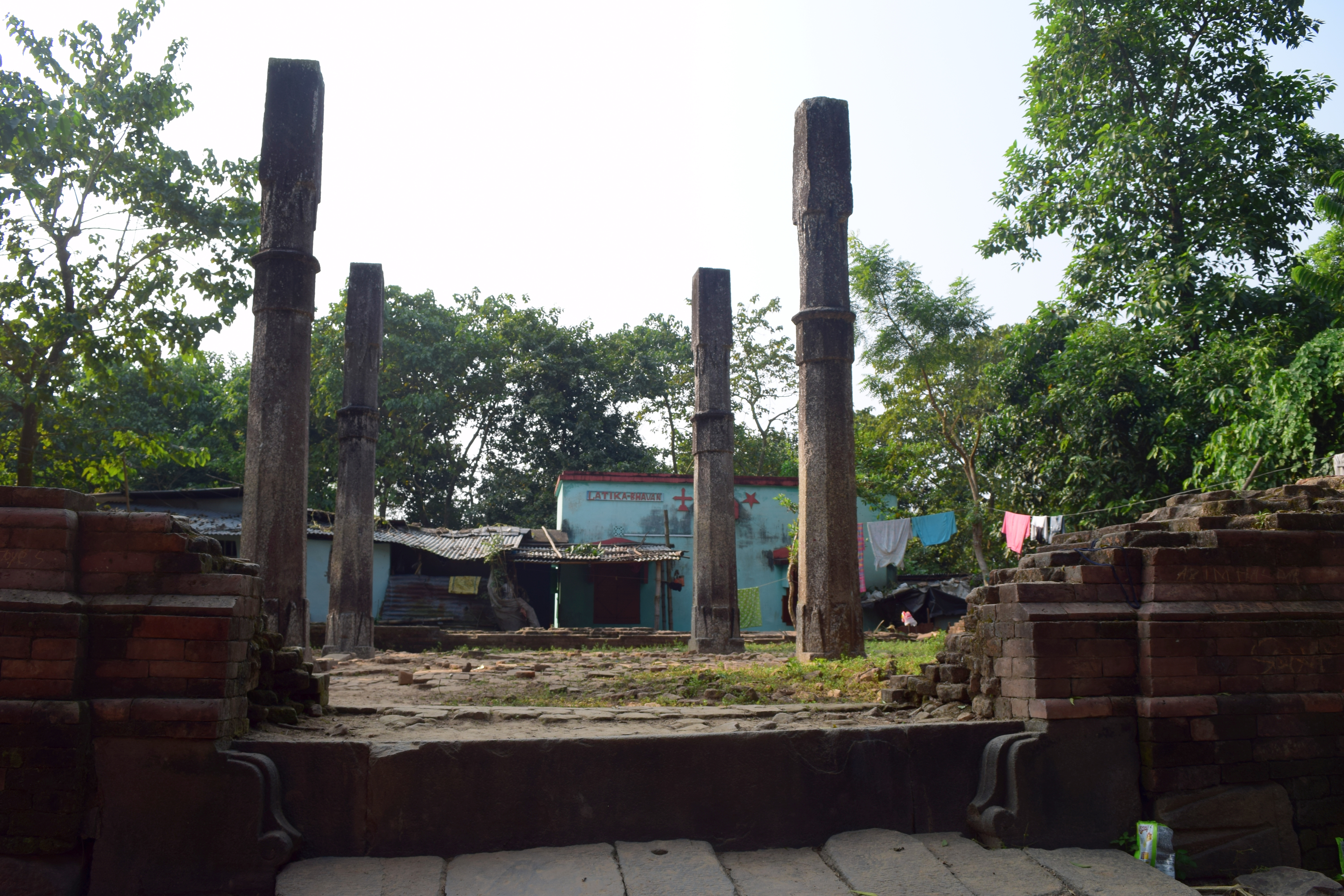
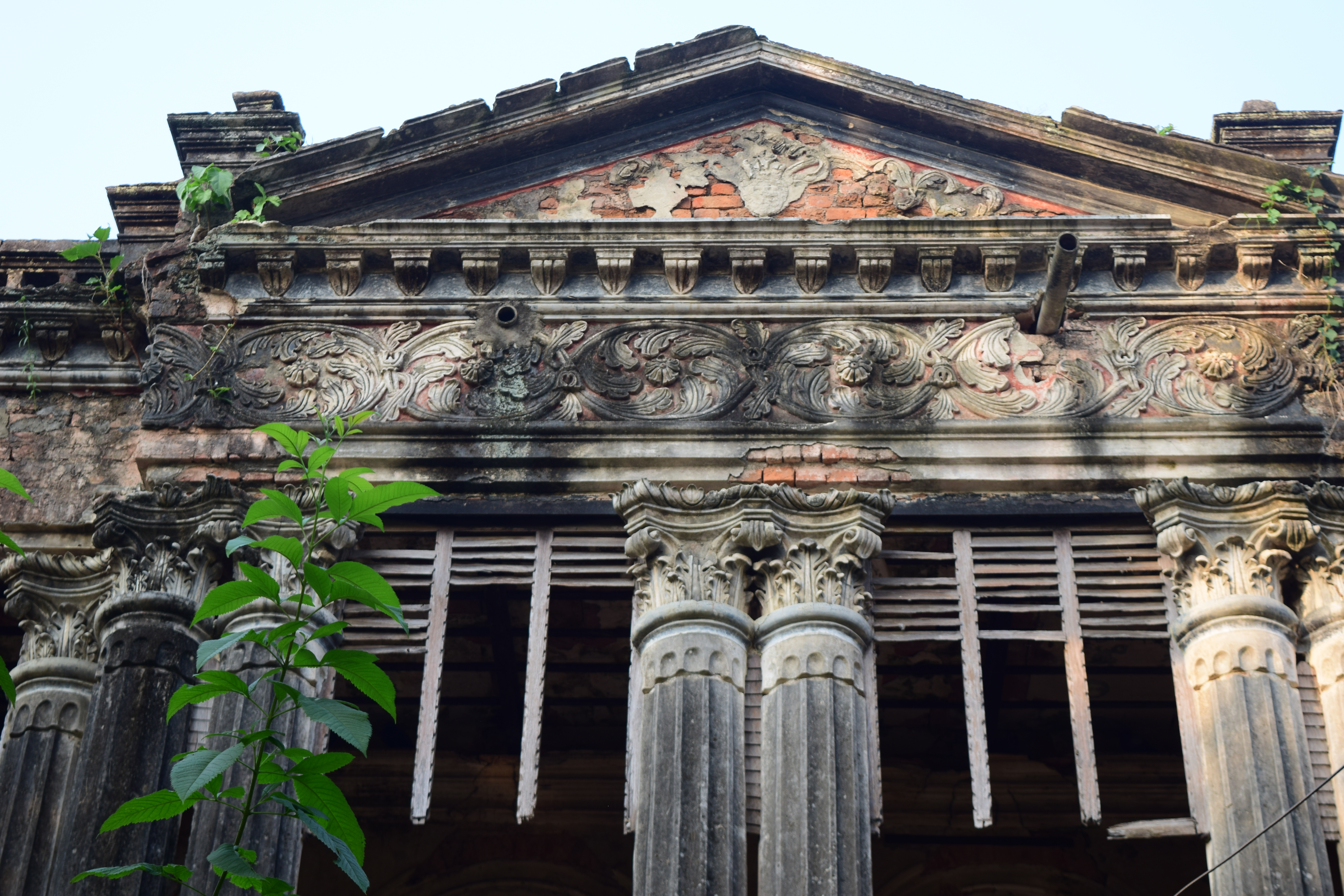
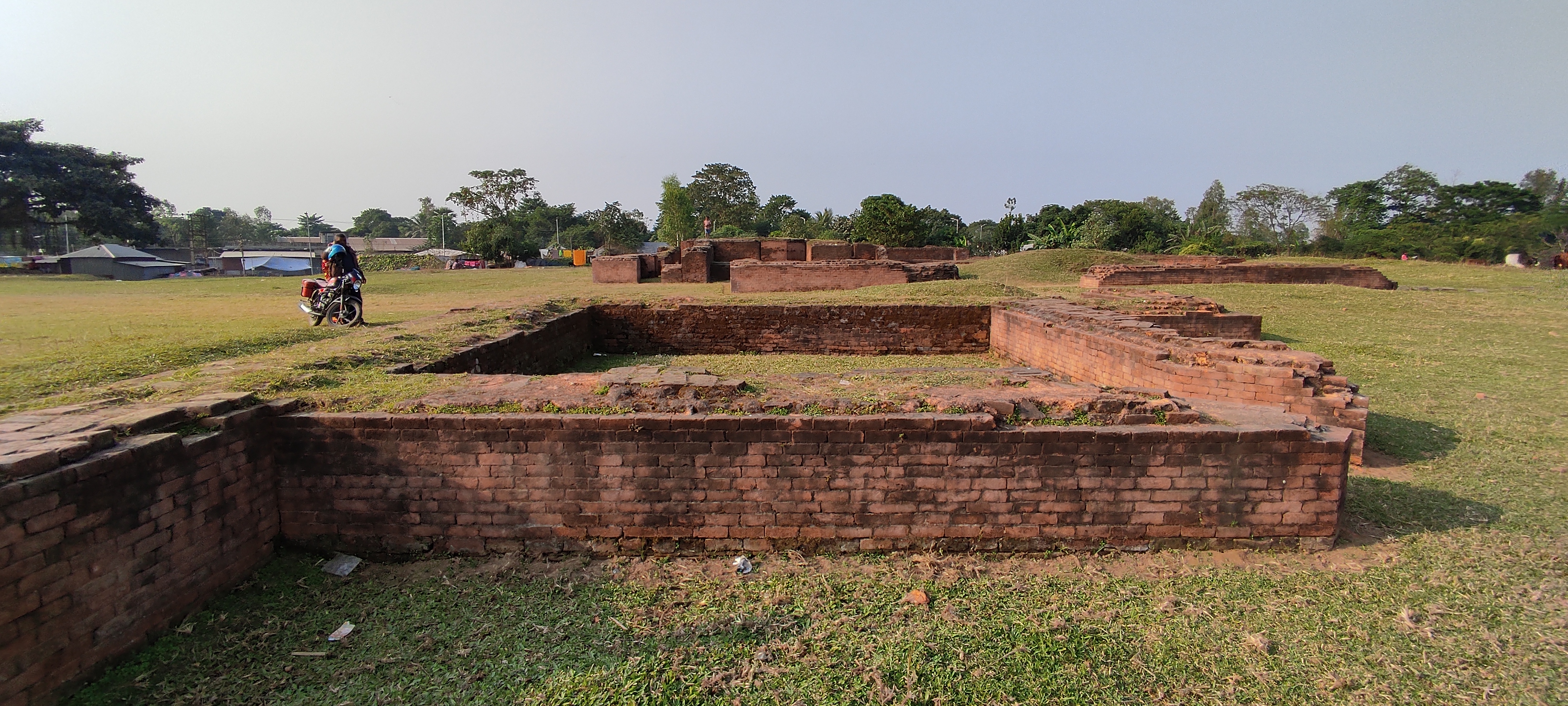
- Clockwise from top-left: Dargah of Shah Ata, Panchamukhi Shiva Temple in Aminpur, Manohali Zaimindar Bari, Mounds at Bangarh, Site of Usha and Aniruddha's Marriage
- Interactive map of Dakshin Dinajpur district
- Coordinates: 25°23′N 88°34′E
- Country: India
- State: West Bengal
- Division: Malda
- Headquarters: Balurghat

Government
  - Subdivisions: Balurghat Sadar, Gangarampur
  - CD Blocks: Hili, Balurghat, Kumarganj, Tapan, Gangarampur, Bansihari, Harirampur, Kushmandi
  - Lok Sabha constituencies: Balurghat
  - Vidhan Sabha constituencies: Kushmandi, Kumarganj, Balurghat, Tapan, Gangarampur, Harirampur

Area
  - Total: 2,219 km^{2} (857 sq mi)

Population (2011)
  - Total: 1,676,276
  - Density: 755.4/km^{2} (1,957/sq mi)
  - Urban: 236,295

Demographics
  - Literacy: 82.36 per cent
  - Sex ratio: 950 ♂/♀

Languages
  - Official: Bengali
  - Additional official: English
- Time zone: UTC+05:30 (IST)
- Website: ddinajpur.nic.in

Dakshin Dinajpur (Bengali pronunciation: [dokkʰiɳ dinadʒpur]), also known as South Dinajpur, is a district in the Indian state of West Bengal, India. It was created on 1 April 1992 by the division of the erstwhile West Dinajpur District. The headquarters (sadar) of the district is at Balurghat. It comprises two subdivisions: Balurghat and Gangarampur. According to the 2011 census, it is the seventh populous district of West Bengal (out of 23).

== History ==
The erstwhile Dinajpur District, at the time of the partition of India, was split up into West Dinajpur district and East Dinajpur. The East Dinajpur district, now called Dinajpur, became part of East Pakistan (now Bangladesh). The West Dinajpur district was enlarged in 1956, when States Reorganisation Act recommendations were implemented, with the addition of some areas of Bihar. The district was bifurcated into Uttar Dinajpur and Dakshin Dinajpur on 1 April 1992.

== Economy ==
Dakshin Dinajpur is predominantly an agricultural district with a large area of land under cultivation. The district is drained by north-south flowing rivers like Atreyee, Purnabhaba, Tangon and Jamuna River, to give rise to a sizeable, unorganised fishing community.

Dakshin Dinajpur is a "non-large scale industry" but there are a number of medium and small hand loom industries especially Gangarampur block. Internet access is available from most of the cities, even broadband connections are available. There is one State Highway with only 77 km of National Highway No. 512 in the district. A new railway line has been laid between Eklakhi and Balurghat, the district headquarters. Train services were started on 30 December 2004.

In 2006 the Ministry of Panchayati Raj named Dakshin Dinajpur one of the country's 250 most backward districts (out of a total of 640). It is one of the eleven districts in West Bengal currently receiving funds from the Backward Regions Grant Fund Programme (BRGF).

== Divisions ==
=== Administrative subdivisions ===
The district comprises two subdivisions: Balurghat and Gangarampur at Buniadpur. Balurghat subdivision consists of Balurghat municipality and four community development blocks: Hili, Balurghat, Kumarganj and Tapan. Gangarampur subdivision consists of Gangarampur, Buniadpur municipalities and four community development blocks: Gangarampur, Bansihari, Harirampur and Kushmandi. Balurghat is the district headquarters. There are nine police stations, eight development blocks, Three municipalities, 64 gram panchayats and 2317 villages in this district.

Other than municipality area, each subdivision contains community development blocs which are divided into rural areas and census towns.

Balurghat subdivision

- Balurghat: municipality
- Hili (Community development block) consists of rural areas only with 5 gram panchayats.
- Balurghat (Community development block) consists of rural areas only with 11 gram panchayats.
- Kumarganj (Community development block) consists of rural areas only with 8 gram panchayats.
- Tapan (Community development block) consists of rural areas only with 11 gram panchayats.

Gangarampur subdivision at Buniadpur

- Buniadpur : Municipality
- Gangarampur : Municipality
- Gangarampur (Community development block) consists of rural areas only with 11 gram panchayats.
- Bansihari (Community development block) consists of rural areas only with 4 gram panchayats.
- Harirampur (Community development block) consists of rural areas only with 6 gram panchayats.
- Kushmandi (Community development block) consists of rural areas only with 8 gram panchayats.

CD Block	Area (km^{2} )	Area (sq mi)	Population (2011)	Density km^{2}	Density sq mi
Balurghat	363.90	140.50	250,760	689.09	1,784.7
Kumarganj	286.90	110.77	169,102	589.41	1,526.6
Hili	88.10	34.02	83,754	950.7	2,462
Tapan	441.10	170.31	250,540	567.99	1,471.1
Gangarampur	315.60	121.85	237,628	752.94	1,950.1
Bansihari,	197.50	76.26	141,286	715.37	1,852.8
Harirampur	214.88	82.97	136,853	636.88	1,649.5
Kushmandi	310.50	119.88	198,752	640.10	1,657.9

=== Assembly constituencies ===
As per order of the Delimitation Commission in respect of the delimitation of constituencies in the West Bengal, the district was divided into six assembly constituencies:

No.	Name	Lok Sabha	MLA	2021 Winner	2024 Lead
37	Kushmandi (SC)	Balurghat	Rekha Roy	Trinamool Congress	Trinamool Congress
38	Kumarganj	Balurghat	Toraf Hossain Mandal	Trinamool Congress	Trinamool Congress
39	Balurghat	Balurghat	Ashok Lahiri	Bharatiya Janata Party	Bharatiya Janata Party
40	Tapan (ST)	Balurghat	Budhrai Tudu	Bharatiya Janata Party	Bharatiya Janata Party
41	Gangarampur (SC)	Balurghat	Satyendra Nath Ray	Bharatiya Janata Party	Bharatiya Janata Party
42	Harirampur	Balurghat	Biplab Mitra	Trinamool Congress	Trinamool Congress

Tapan constituency is reserved for ST candidates. Kushmandi and Gangarampur constituencies are reserved for SC candidates. Along with Itahar assembly constituency from Uttar Dinajpur district, the six assembly constituencies of this district form the Balurghat (Lok Sabha constituency).

== Demographics ==
Historical population
Year	Pop.	±% p.a.
1901	340,163	—
1911	363,212	+0.66%
1921	319,170	−1.28%
1931	342,245	+0.70%
1941	383,042	+1.13%
1951	448,275	+1.59%
1961	563,598	+2.32%
1971	772,618	+3.20%
1981	989,294	+2.50%
1991	1,230,608	+2.21%
2001	1,503,178	+2.02%
2011	1,676,276	+1.10%
Source: Census of India

According to the 2011 census Dakshin Dinajpur district has a population of 1,676,276. roughly equal to the nation of Guinea-Bissau. or the US state of Idaho. This gives it a ranking of 295th in India (out of a total of 640). The district has a population density of 753 inhabitants per square kilometre (1,950/sq mi). Its population growth rate over the decade 2001–2011 was 11.16%. Dakshin Dinajpur has a sex ratio of 954 females for every 1000 males and a literacy rate of 73.86%. 14.10% of the population lives in urban areas. Scheduled Castes and Scheduled Tribes make up 28.80% and 16.43% of the population respectively.

=== Religion ===
Religions of Dakshin Dinajpur district (2011)
Religion	Percent
Hinduism	73.55%
Islam	24.63%
Christianity	1.48%
Other or not stated	0.34%

Religion in present-day Dakshin Dinajpur district
Religion	Population (1941)	Percentage (1941)	Population (2011)	Percentage (2011)
Islam	136,873	38.61%	412,788	24.63%
Hinduism	135,299	38.16%	1,232,850	73.55%
Tribal religion	82,105	23.16%	2,786	0.17%
Christianity	146	0.04%	24,794	1.48%
Others (Note: Including Jainism, Christianity, Buddhism, Zoroastrianism, Judaism, Ad-Dharmis, or not stated)	105	0.03%	3,058	0.17%
Total Population	354,528	100%	1,676,276	100%

Dakshin Dinajpur district has a majority Hindu population with over 73% people following Hinduism. Islam is the second-largest religion in the district with over 24% adherents. Christianity is followed by 1.48% of people. Muslims and Christians are almost entirely rural, and the urban population is nearly entirely Hindu. Muslims are a significant minority in Harirampur (49.00%) and Kushmandi (38.86%) CD blocks.

=== Languages ===
Languages of Dakshin Dinajpur District (2011)
1. Bengali (84.4%)
2. Santali (9.68%)
3. Kurukh (1.31%)
4. Sadri (1.25%)
5. Hindi (1.05%)
6. Others (2.30%)

Bengali is the principal language of the district. The main Bengali dialect of this region is variously known as Varendri Bengali or Dinajpuri Bengali.

According to the 2011 census, 84.41% of the population spoke Bengali, 9.68% Santali, 1.31% Kurukh, 1.25% Sadri and 1.05% Hindi as their first language.

== Education ==
Dakshin Dinajpur University has started functioning from 2021. It is located at Mahinagar, Balurghat. There is a government nursing college at Balurghat. There is one JNV present. There is one D.A.V group school (Atreyee DAV Public School) and a Techno Group school at Balurghat. There are a few good schools in Balurghat and Gangarampur. There are four CBSE affiliated and one CISCE affiliated school in Balurghat. Of late, The Green View English Academy is the only CISCE affiliated school in the entire district. The Atreyee D.A.V Public School has earned several accolades, giving the entire district an honorable position in the academic map of the country.

Higher Education Institutions
Institution Type	Institution Name	Institution Location
University	Dakshin Dinajpur University	Balurghat
Agricultural Universities (India)	Uttar Banga Krishi Viswavidyalaya	Majhian
General College	Balurghat College	Balurghat
General College	Balurghat Mahila Mahavidyalaya	Balurghat
General College	Buniadpur Mahavidyalaya	Buniadpur
General College	Dewan Abdul Goni College	Harirampur, West Bengal
General College	Gangarampur B.Ed College	Gangarampur
General College	Gangarampur College	Gangarampur
General College	Jamini Majumdar Memorial College	Patiram
General College	Kumarganj College	Kumarganj
General College	Kushmandi Government College	Kushmandi
General College	Nathaniyal Murmu Memorial College	Tapan, Dakshin Dinajpur
General College	S.B.S. Government College, Hili	Hili, Dakshin Dinajpur
General College	Jamini Majumdar Memorial College	Patiram
General College	Dakshin Dinajpur B.Ed College	Fulbari
General College	Balurghat B.Ed.College	Balurghat
General College	Vidyasagar College Of Education	Gangarampur
General College	Dakshin Dinajpur D.Ed College	Tapan, Dakshin Dinajpur
General College	Tebhaga Teachers Training College	Margram
General College	Bahadurpur B.Ed College	Dhkshin Bahadurpur
General College	Bangarh Scholar Teacher's Training Institute	Bolla
General College	Atryee College Of Education	Dangi
General College	Buniadpur Teachers' Training College	Buniadpur
Polytechnic College	Gangarampur Government Polytechnic	Gangarampur
Polytechnic College	Hilli Government Polytechnic	Hili, Dakshin Dinajpur
Industrial training institute	Banshihari Government ITI	Bansihari (community development block)
Industrial training institute	Balurghat Government ITI	Balurghat
Industrial training institute	Harirampur Government ITI	Harirampur, West Bengal
Industrial training institute	Hili Government ITI	Hili, Dakshin Dinajpur
Industrial training institute	Kumarganj Government ITI	Kumarganj
Industrial training institute	Tafijuddin Ahamed Memorial, Kushmandi Government ITI	Kushmandi
Industrial training institute	Tapan Government ITI	Tapan, Dakshin Dinajpur
Law College	Balurghat Law College	Balurghat
Nursing College	Nursing Training School Dakshin Dinajpur	Balurghat

== Tourist attractions ==
- Bairhatta
- Bangarh
- Kaldighi Park (Gangarampur)
- Gour Dighi
- Grave of Bakhtiar Khilji
- Dhal Dighi
- Bolla Kali Temple
- Binshira Roth yatra
- Khanpur (Tebhaga movement)
- Radha Gobindo Mandir (Tapan)
- Sarongbari
- Mahipal Dighi

== Notable people ==
- Rafikul Islam (born 1956), social worker, farmer and politician
- Toraf Hossain Mandal (born 1959), social worker and politician
- Mafuja Khatun (born 1970), first female Muslim BJP candidate
- Moslehuddin Ahmed, three-time MLA
- Mahmuda Begum, politician
- Khalil Sayed, inaugural MLA of Kushmandi
- Abhijit Mondal - Footballer.
- Sukanta Majumdar - Asstt. Professor, University of Gour Banga, politician, 10th President of West Bengal BJP
- Biplab Mitra - politician
- Rekha Roy - Politician
- Biswanath Chowdhury - former minister of West Bengal state
- Budhrai Tudu - politician
- Sankar Chakraborty - politician
- Satyendra Nath Ray - politician
- Prasanta Kumar Majumdar - politician
- Ranen Barman - politician
- Palas Barman - politician
- Rasendra Nath Barman - politician
- Selku Mardi - politician
- Dhiren Banerjee - Indian Freedom fighter, politician and physician
- Narmada Chandra Roy - politician and a seven-time MLA from Kushmandi
- Debasree Chaudhuri - politician, former Minister of State for Woman and Child Development, Government of India
