= West Dinajpur district =

Former district in West Bengal, India

West Dinajpur
- Former District
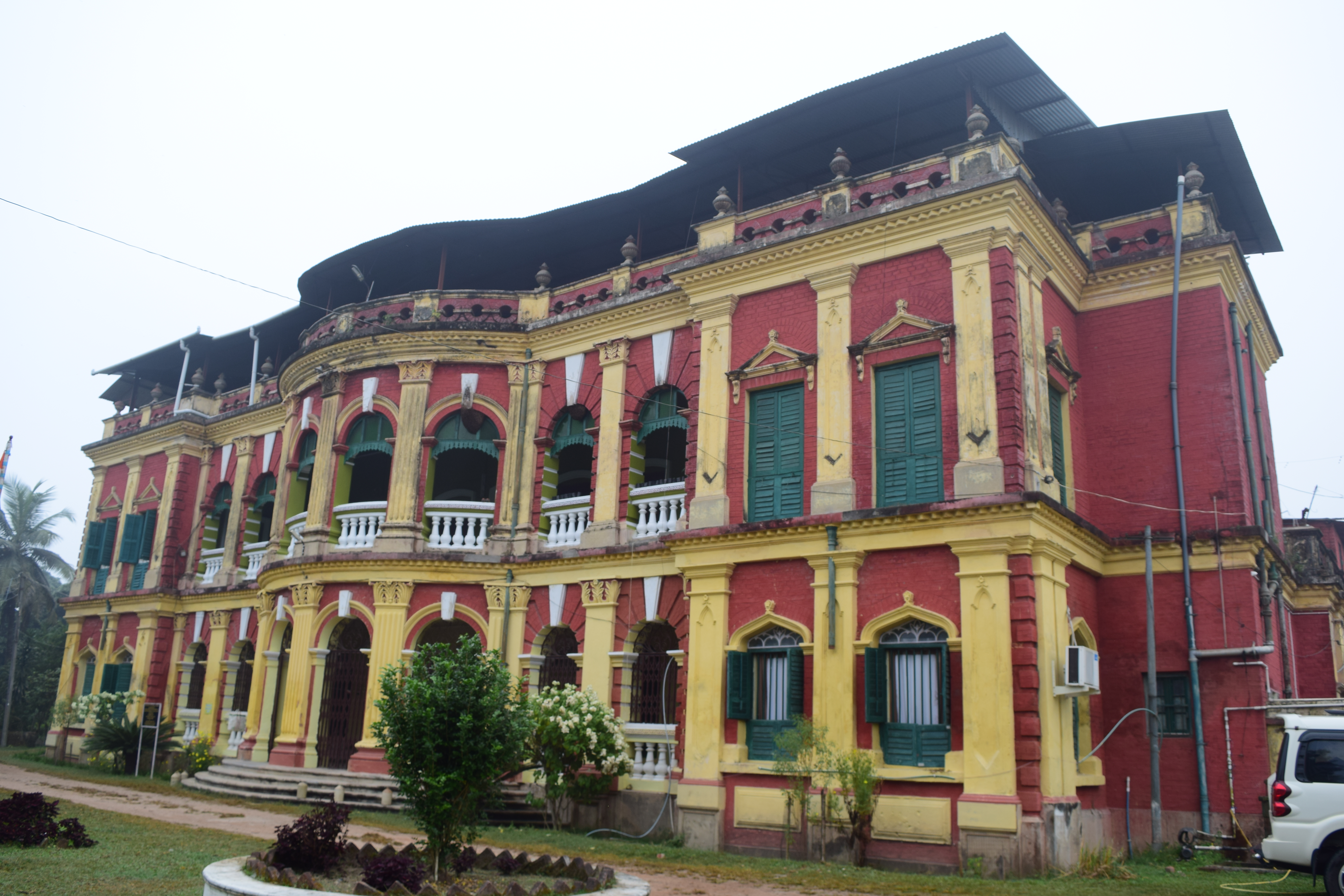
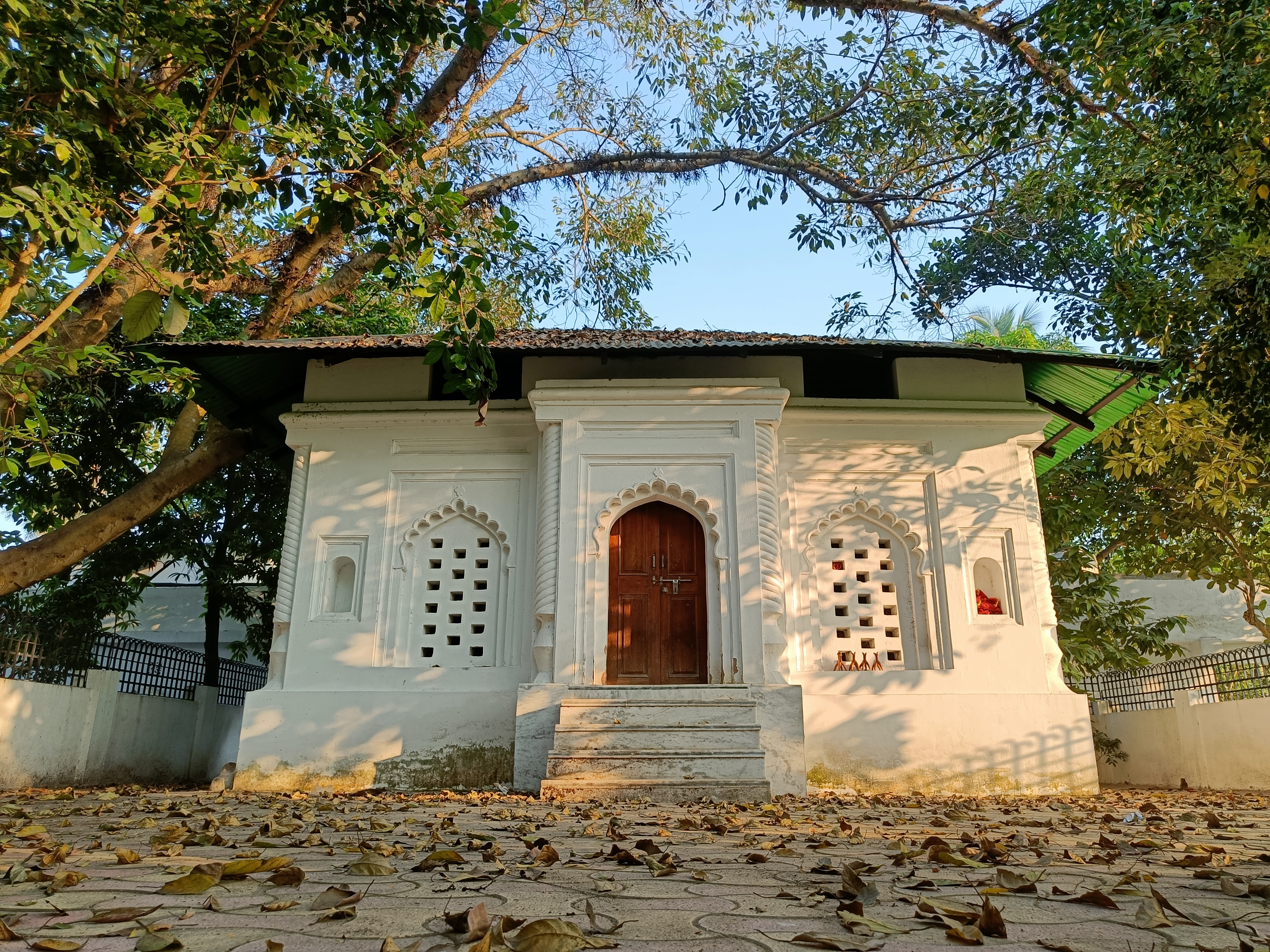
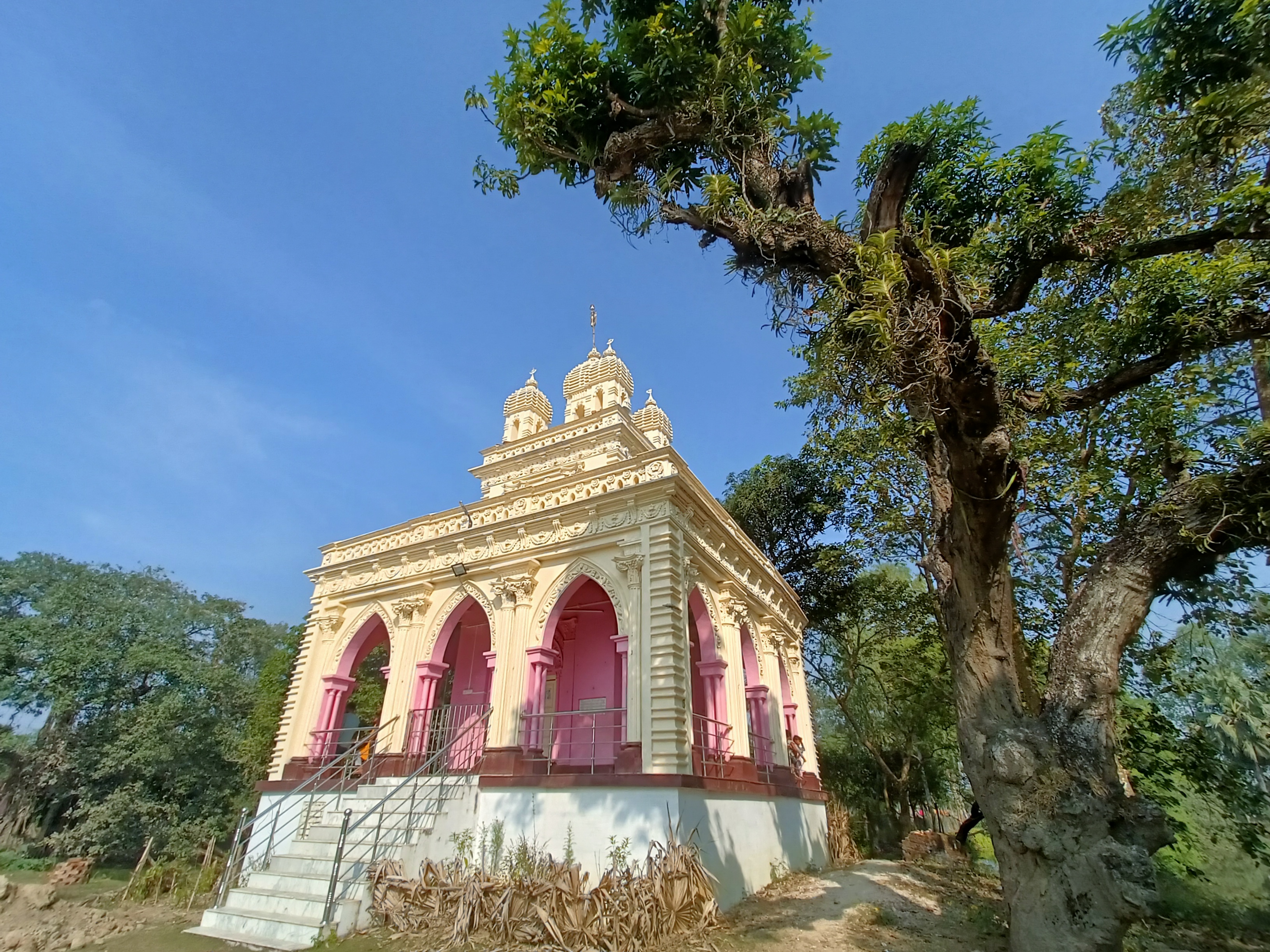
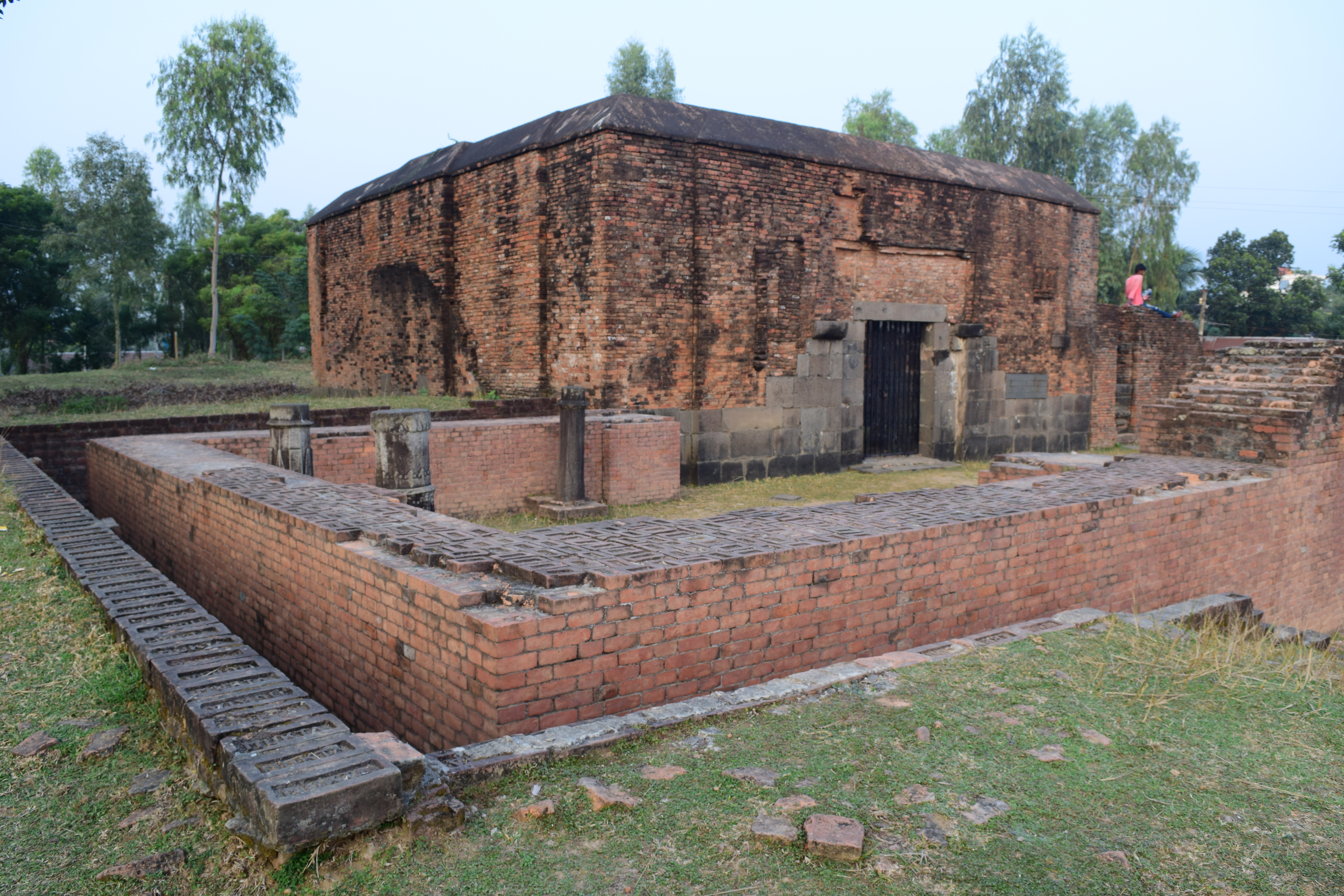
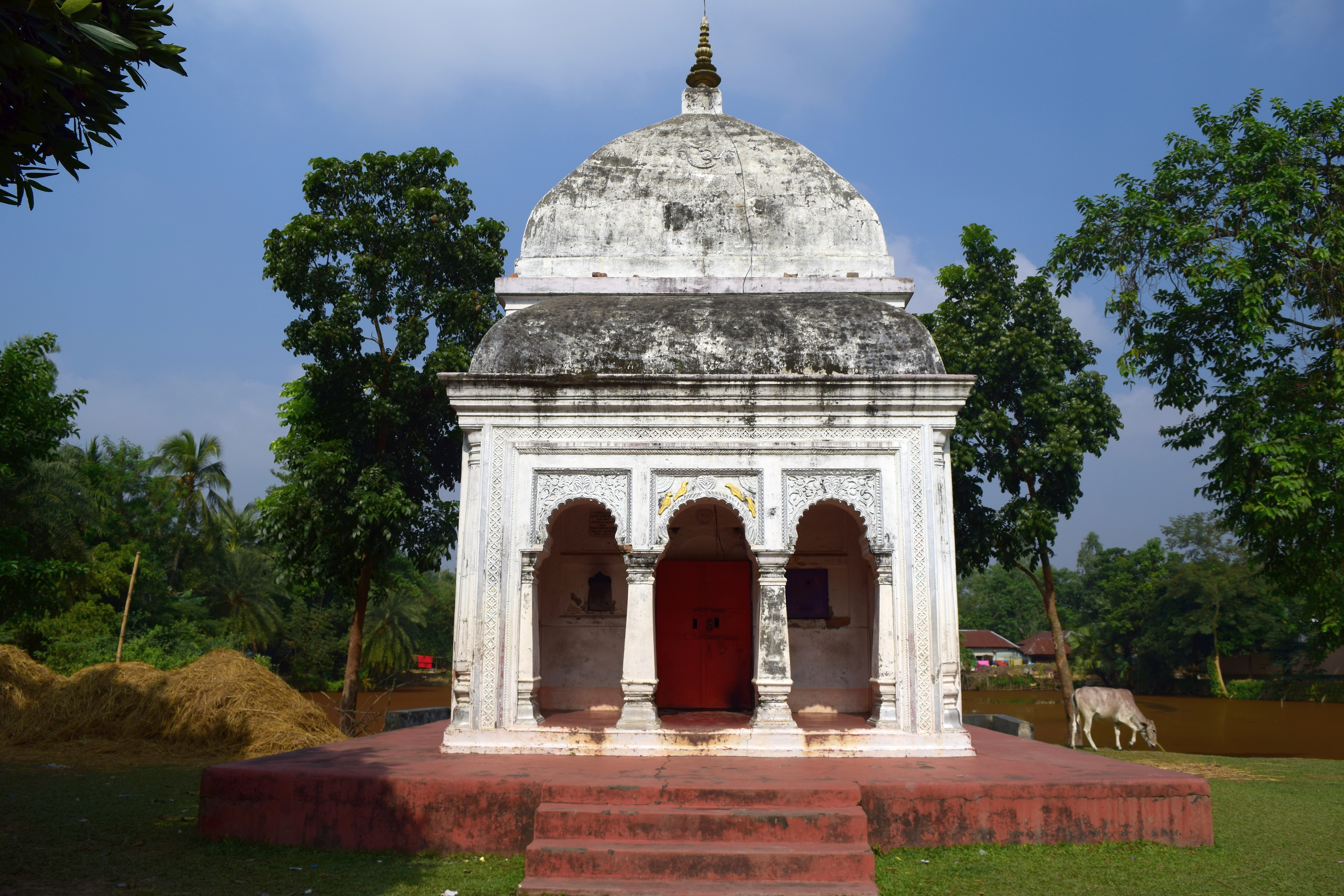
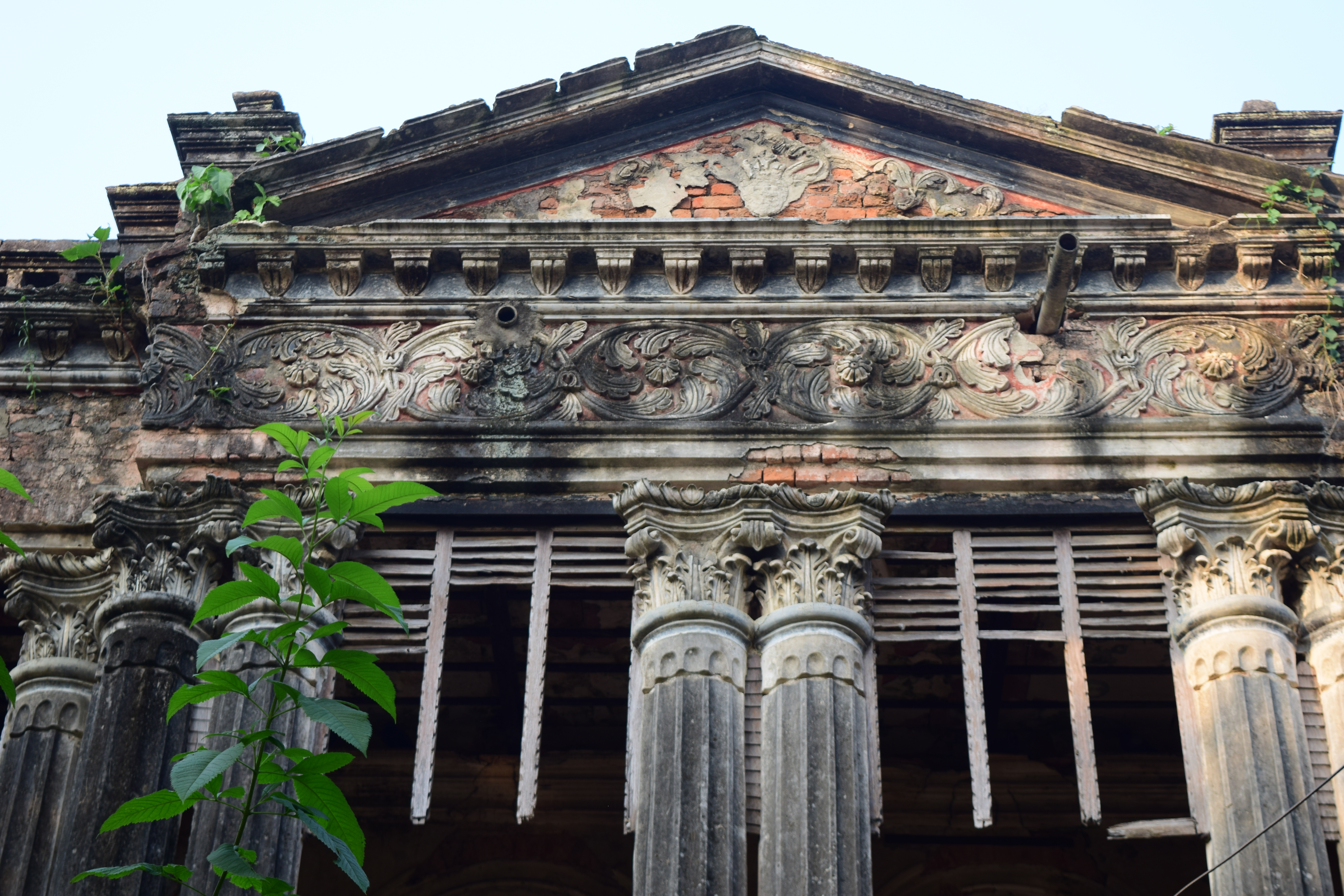
- Clockwise from top: Durgapur Rajbari, Pramateshwar Mahadeb Mondir, Panchamukhi Shiva Temple in Aminpur, Manohali Zaimindar Bari, Dargah of Shah Ata, Pirpukur Dargah in Raiganj

- Location of West Dinajpur district in West Bengal
- Coordinates: 25°23′N 88°34′E
- Country: India
- State: West Bengal
- Division: Malda
- Headquarters: Balurghat

Government
  - Subdivisions: Balurghat Sadar, Gangarampur, Raiganj, Islampur
  - CD Blocks: Hili, Balurghat, Kumarganj, Tapan, Gangarampur, Bansihari, Harirampur, Kushmandi, Raiganj, Hemtabad, Kaliaganj, Itahar, Islampur, Chopra, Goalpokhar I, Goalpokhar II, Karandighi
  - Lok Sabha constituencies: Balurghat, Raiganj
  - Vidhan Sabha constituencies: Kushmandi, Kumarganj, Balurghat, Tapan, Gangarampur, Harirampur, Chopra, Islampur, Goalpokhar, Chakulia, Karandighi, Hemtabad, Kaliaganj, Raiganj, Itahar

Area
  - Total: 5,358 km^{2} (2,069 sq mi)

Population (1991)
  - Total: 3,127,653
  - Density: 583.7/km^{2} (1,512/sq mi)
  - Urban: 349,359

Demographics
  - Literacy: 27.00 per cent
  - Sex ratio: 937 ♂/♀

Languages
  - Official: Bengali
  - Additional official: English
- Time zone: UTC+05:30 (IST)
- Website: www.westdinajpur.nic.in

West Dinajpur (Pron: ˈpoʃtʃim dinad͡ʒpur), or sometimes Paschim Dinajpur, is a former district in the Indian state of West Bengal, headquartered in Balurghat. On 1 April 1992, the district was bifurcated into two separate districts namely Uttar Dinajpur and Dakshin Dinajpur.

== History ==
Undivided Dinajpur district was part of the Pundra and Gauda Kingdom of ancient Bengal. The whole of Pundra was part of the Maurya Empire, and Jainism was spread in the region in the fourth century BCE. Their capital was at Pundrabardhan (now in Bangladesh), and two other ancient towns were Gourpur and Kotibarsha, now called Bangarh. Later multiple inscriptions show how the Guptas also controlled Pundra. After the reign of Gauda Kingdom, the district was then ruled by Pala Empire from 750 CE. The Senas overthrew the Palas in 1143. In 1204, Muhammad bin Bakhtiyar Khalji defeated the Senas and had Bangarh as its capital. After his murder, it was controlled by various governors sent by the Delhi Sultan from Gauda. In 1586, Mughal Emperor Akbar conquered Bengal and Dinajpur was controlled by the sarkars of Tajpur and Panjara. In 1765, it fell under the rule of the East India Company and was ruled from Murshidabad. In the later part of the 18th century, the district was home to the Sanyasi-Fakir rebellion until the early 19th century. At the time of India's independence, the former Dinajpur district of undivided Bengal was partitioned along religious lines, and West Dinajpur became one of the 14 districts of West Bengal. The other part of the district continues as Dinajpur district of Bangladesh.

With the States Reorganisation Act of 1956, some Bengali-speaking areas from Bihar were added to this district. On 1 April 1992, the West Dinajpur district was divided into Uttar Dinajpur district and Dakshin Dinajpur district.

== Demographics ==
Historical population
Year	Pop.	±% p.a.
1901	741,284	—
1911	791,512	+0.66%
1921	695,536	−1.28%
1931	745,821	+0.70%
1941	834,726	+1.13%
1951	976,882	+1.59%
1961	1,323,797	+3.09%
1971	1,859,887	+3.46%
1981	2,404,947	+2.60%
1991	3,127,653	+2.66%
Note: After 1991, the West Dinajpur district was bifurcated into two separate districts namely Uttar Dinajpur and Dakshin Dinajpur. The census data is the addition of two split districts. Source: Census of India
