= Harirampur =

Harirampur may refer to:

- Harirampur Upazila, an upazila (subdistrict) of Bangladesh
- Harirampur (community development block), a subdistrict in Dakshin Dinajpur district, West Bengal, India
- Harirampur, West Bengal, a town in India
- Harirampur (Vidhan Sabha constituency), a constituency of the West Bengal Legislative Assembly
