= Gangarampur subdivision =

- Subdivision
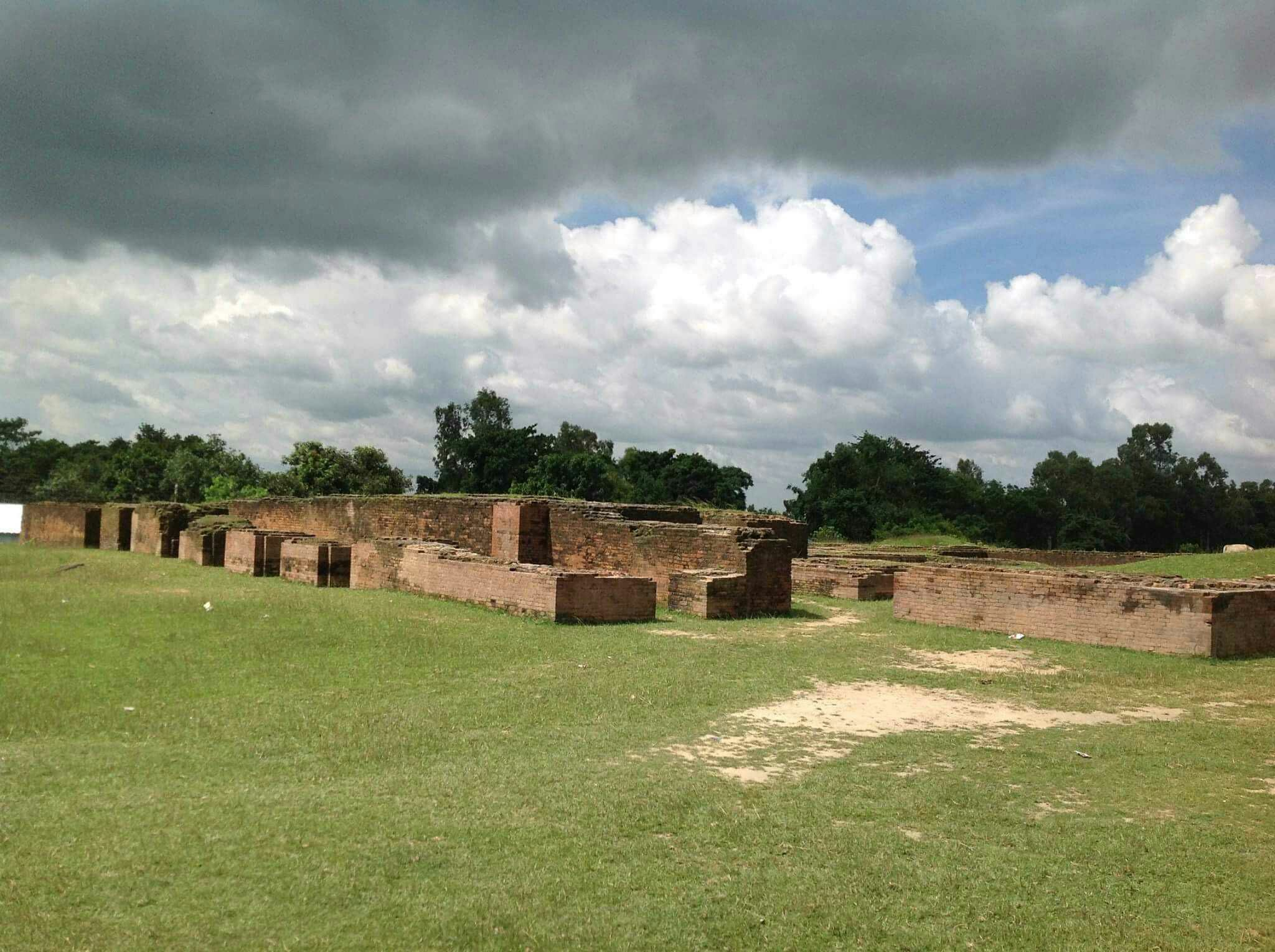
- Historical ruins of Bangarh

- Coordinates: 25.40°N 88.52°E
- Country: India
- State: West Bengal
- District: South Dinajpur
- Headquarter: Buniadpur

Area
  - Total: 1,047.90 km^{2} (404.60 sq mi)

Population (2011)
  - Total: 770,736
  - Density: 735.505/km^{2} (1,904.95/sq mi)

Languages
  - Official: Bengali, English
- Time zone: UTC+5:30 (IST)
- ISO 3166 code: ISO 3166-2:IN
- Vehicle registration: WB

Gangarampur subdivision is an administrative subdivision of the Dakshin Dinajpur district in the Indian state of West Bengal.

== Subdivisions ==
Dakshin Dinajpur district is divided into two administrative subdivisions:

Subdivision	Headquarters	Area km^{2}2001	Population (2011)	Urban population % (2011)	Rural Population % (2011)
Balurghat	Balurghat	1,202.88	905,540	18.56	81.44
Gangarampur	Buniadpur	1,047.90	770,736	8.86	91.14
Dakshin Dinajpur district	Balurghat	2,219.00*	1,676,276	14.10	85.90

.*2011

== Administrative units ==
Gangarampur subdivision has 4 police stations, 4 community development blocks, 4 panchayat samitis, 30 gram panchayats, 750 mouzas, 730 inhabited villages, 2 municipalities and 2 census towns. The municipalities are at Gangarampur and Buniadpur. The census towns are: Gopalpur and Harirampur. The subdivision has its headquarters at Buniadpur.

== Police stations ==
Police stations in Balurghat subdivision have the following features and jurisdiction:

Police station	Area covered (km^{2})	Border (km)	Population	Municipal town/ city	CD Block
Gangarampur	n/a	n/a	?	Gangarampur	Gangarampur
Kushmandi	n/a	n/a	?	-	Kushmandi
Bansihari	n/a	-	?	Buniadpur	Bansihari
Harirampur	n/a	-	?	-	Harirampur

== Blocks ==
Community development blocks in Balurghat subdivision are:

CD Block	Headquarters	Area km^{2}	Population (2011)	SC %	ST %	Hindus %	Muslims %	Literacy rate %	Census Towns
Gangarampur	Gangarampur	315.52	237,628	30.41	0.13	63.66	34.44	71.45	1
Kushmandi	Kushmandi	310.63	198,752	44.76	7.86	60.38	38.73	65.43	-
Bansihari	Buniadpur	196.52	141,286	12.39	21.95	73.99	24.21	68.79	-
Harirampur	Harirampur	214.94	136,853	21.81	16.85	49.62	47.98	64.67	1

== Gram panchayats ==
The subdivision contains 30 gram panchayats under 4 community development blocks:

- Gangarampur block consists of 11 gram panchayats, viz. Ashokegram, Belbari–II, Gangarampur, Sukdevpur, Basuria, Chaloon, Jahangirpur, Uday, Belbari–I, Damdama and 4no.Nandanpur.
- Banshihari block consists of 4 gram panchayats, viz. Ellahabad, Ganguria, Brajaballavpur and Mahabari.
- Harirampur block consists of 6 gram panchayats, viz. Bagichapur, Gokarna, Saiyadpur, Bairhatta, Pundari and Shirshi.
- Kushmandi block consists of 8 gram panchayats, viz. Akcha, Deul, Karanji, Maligaon, Beroil, Kalikamora, Kushmandi and Udaypur.

== Education ==
Dakshin Dinajpur district had a literacy rate of 72.82% (for population of 7 years and above) as per the census of 2011. Balurghat subdivision had a literacy rate of 75.78%, Gangarampur subdivision 69.24%.

Data in the table below gives a comprehensive picture of the education scenario in Dakshin district for the year 2013-14:

Subdivision	Primary School		Middle School		High School		Higher Secondary School		General College, Univ		Technical / Professional Instt		Non-formal Education	
Subdivision	Institution	Student	Institution	Student	Institution	Student	Institution	Student	Institution	Student	Institution	Student	Institution	Student
Balurghat	671	46,548	42	4,482	52	74,677	55	68,352	4	6,930	4	385	2,304	55,876
Gangarampur	505	51,355	56	5,078	33	82,967	51	69,003	3	7,100	1	100	1,457	51,230
Dakshin Dinajpur district	1,176	97,903	98	9,560	85	157,644	106	137,655	7	14,030	5	485	3,761	107,106

Note: Primary schools include junior basic schools; middle schools, high schools and higher secondary schools include madrasahs; technical schools include junior technical schools, junior government polytechnics, industrial technical institutes, industrial training centres, nursing training institutes etc.; technical and professional colleges include engineering colleges, medical colleges, para-medical institutes, management colleges, teachers training and nursing training colleges, law colleges, art colleges, music colleges etc. Special and non-formal education centres include sishu siksha kendras, madhyamik siksha kendras, centres of Rabindra mukta vidyalaya, recognised Sanskrit tols, institutions for the blind and other handicapped persons, Anganwadi centres, reformatory schools etc.

The following institutions are in Gangarampur subdivision:

Gangarampur College was established in 1981 at Gangarampur.

Buniadpur Mahavidyalaya was established at Buniadpur in 2007.

Dewan Abdul Gani College was established at Harirampur in 1994.

Kushmandi Government College was established at Kushmandi in 2015.

== Healthcare ==
The table below (all data in numbers) presents an overview of the medical facilities available and patients treated in the hospitals, health centres and sub-centres in 2014 in Dakshin Dinajpur district.

Subdivision	Health & Family Welfare Deptt, WB				Other State Govt Deptts	Local bodies	Central Govt Deptts / PSUs	NGO / Private Nursing Homes	Total	Total Number of Beds	Total Number of Doctors*	Indoor Patients	Outdoor Patients
Subdivision	Hospitals	Rural Hospitals	Block Primary Health Centres	Primary Health Centres	Other State Govt Deptts	Local bodies	Central Govt Deptts / PSUs	NGO / Private Nursing Homes	Total	Total Number of Beds	Total Number of Doctors*	Indoor Patients	Outdoor Patients
Balurghat	1	4	1	12	1	1	-	3	23	822	69	64,346	1,233,046
Gangarampur	1	3	-	6	-	-	-	6	16	465	43	49,043	898,363
Dakshin Dinajpur district	2	7	1	18	1	1	-	9	39	1,287	112	113,389	2,131,409

.* Excluding nursing homes

Medical facilities available in Gangarampur subdivision are as follows:

Hospitals: (Name, location, beds)
Gangarampur subdivisional hospital, Gangarampur, 250 beds
Rural Hospitals: (Name, block, location, beds)
Harirampur Rural Hospital, Harirampur CD Block, Harirampur, 30 beds
Rashidpur Rural Hospital, Bansihari CD Block, Rashidpur, 30 beds
Kushmandi Rural Hospital, Kushmandi CD Block, Kushmandi, Dakshin Dinajpur, 30 beds
Block Primary Health Centre: (Name, location, beds)
Mathurapur (Chalon) BPHC, Gangarampur CD Block, PO Bansagar, 10 beds
Primary Health Centres: (CD Block-wise)(CD Block, PHC location, beds)
Gangarampur CD Block: Sarbamangala (Sarbamangala (Bansuria) PHC) (10)
Harirampur CD Block: Balihara (10)
Bansihari CD Block: Badalpur (10)
Kushmandi CD Block: Sehail (Nanaharpara PHC) (10), Aminpur (10)

== Electoral constituencies ==
Lok Sabha (parliamentary) and Vidhan Sabha (state assembly) constituencies in Gangarampur subdivision were as follows:

Lok Sabha constituency	Reservation	Vidhan Sabha constituency	Reservation	CD Block and/or Gram panchayats and/or municipal areas
Balurghat	None	Gangarampur	SC	Gangarampur municipality, Belbari I, Damdama, Gangarampur and Nandanpur GPs of Gangrampur CD Block, and Ajmatpur, Autina, Gurail, Hazratpur, Ramchandrapur and Rampara Chenchra GPs of Tapan CD Block
		Kushmandi	SC	Kushmandi CD Block and Belbari II, Jahangirpur and Sukdebpur GPs of Gangarampur
		Harirampur	None	Harirampur CD Bloock and Bansihari CD Block
		Kumarganj	None	Kumarganj CD Block and Ashokegram, Basuria, Chaloon and Uday GPs of Gangarampur CD Block
		Other assembly segments outside the subdivision		
