= Abuhar =

Village in West Bengal

- Village
- Location within West Bengal Location within India
- Coordinates: 25°27′50.34″N 88°22′57.99″E
- Country: India
- State: West Bengal
- District: Dakshin Dinajpur

Area
  - Total: 1.377 km^{2} (0.532 sq mi)

Population (2011)
  - Total: 984
  - Male: 496
  - Female: 488

Muslims = 100% ▲ Hindus = 0% Others (Christian, Sikh, Buddhists) = 0%

Languages
  - Official: Bengali, English
- Time zone: UTC+5:30 (IST)
- PIN: 733121
- Telephone Code: 03524
- Vehicle registration: WB
- Climate: Moderate, Comfortable (Köppen)
- Lok Sabha constituency: Balurghat
- Nearest city: Buniadpur
- Website: ddinajpur.nic.in

Abuhar is a small village located in Kushmandi subdivision of Dakshin Dinajpur district in West Bengal, India.

== Location ==
It is situated 10.8 km (6.7 mi) from sub-district headquarters Buniadpur. Balurghat is the district headquarters of this village. Kalikamora gram panchayat is the gram panchayat of this village. The total geographical area of the village is 137.7 hectares (340 acres; 1.377 km^{2}). The village code of this village is 310462.

== Population ==
With about 248 houses, this village has a total population of 984 people amongst them are 496 male and 488 female and a total geographical area of 137.7 hectares (340 acres) or 1.377 km^{2}. The literacy rate of the total population of this village is 71.65% among 73.59% males and 69.67% females are literate.

== See also ==
- Amlahar village in Dakshin Dinajpur.
- Kalikamora village in Dakshin Dinajpur.
