= Nahit =

Nahit or NAHIT may refer to:

- Nahit, West Bengal, a village in West Bengal
- Nahit (Russian word), see chickpea
- NAHIT, National Alliance for Health Information Technology, see RHIO
- Nahit Menteşe (1932–2024), Turkish politician
