= Gangarampur (community development block) =

- Community development block
- Coordinates: 25.40°N 88.52°E
- Country: India
- State: West Bengal
- District: Dakshin Dinajpur

Government
  - Type: Community development block

Area
  - Total: 315.60 km^{2} (121.85 sq mi)

Population (2011)
  - Total: 237,628
  - Density: 752.94/km^{2} (1,950.1/sq mi)

Languages
  - Official: Bengali, English
- Time zone: UTC+5:30 (IST)
- Lok Sabha constituency: Balurghat
- Vidhan Sabha constituency: Gangarampur, Kushmandi
- Website: ddinajpur.nic.in

Gangarampur is a community development block that forms an administrative division in Gangarampur subdivision of Dakshin Dinajpur district in the Indian state of West Bengal.34

== History ==
Dinajpur district was constituted in 1786. In 1947, the Radcliffe Line placed the Sadar and Thakurgaon subdivisions of Dinajpur district in East Pakistan. The Balurghat subdivision of Dinajpur district was reconstituted as West Dinajpur district in West Bengal. The new Raiganj subdivision was formed in 1948. In order to restore territorial links between northern and southern parts of West Bengal which had been snapped during the partition of Bengal, and on the recommendations of the States Reorganisation Commission a portion of the erstwhile Kishanganj subdivision comprising Goalpokhar, Islampur and Chopra thanas (police stations) and parts of Thakurganj thana, along with the adjacent parts of the erstwhile Gopalpur thana in Katihar subdivision were transferred from Purnea district in Bihar to West Bengal in 1956, and were formally incorporated into Raiganj subdivision in West Dinajpur. The township of Kishanganj and its entire municipal boundary remained within Bihar. With the introduction of the Community Development Programme in 1960–61, community development blocks were set up in West Dinajpur district. In 1992, West Dinajpur district was bifurcated and Dakshin Dinajpur district was established.

== Geography ==
Gangarampur is located at 25°24′N 88°31′E.

Dakshin Dinajpur district is physiographically a part of the Barind Tract. The area is generally flat and slightly undulating. The elevation of the district is about 15 metres above mean sea level. However, the soil varies. CD Blocks such as Balurghat, Hili and Kumarganj have alluvial soil, Tapan CD Block has laterite soil. There are three main rivers. The Atreyee comes from Bangladesh, flows through Kumarganj and Balurghat CD Blocks and goes back to Bangladesh. The Punarbhaba flows through Gangarampur and Tapan CD Blocks. The Tangon flows through Kushmandi and Bansihari CD Blocks. There is a small river named Jamuna in the Hili CD Block. All rivers, flowing from north to south, overflow during the monsoons and cause floods.

Gangarampur CD Block is bounded by Biral and Dinajpur Sadar Upazilas in Dinajpur District, Bangladesh, on the north, Kumarganj CD Block on the east, Tapan CD Block on the south, Bansihari and Kushmandi CD Blocks on the west.

Six out of the eight CD Blocks in the district are on the India-Bangladesh border popularly referred to as a porous border. 2,216 km of the 4,096 km long India-Bangladesh border falls in West Bengal. More than 11,000 people live near/ around the zero line in Dakshin Dinajpur. Approximately 252 km of the international border is in Dakshin Dinajpur district.

Gangarampur CD Block has an area of 315.52 km^{2}.It has 1 panchayat samity, 11 gram panchayats, 161 gram sansads (village councils), 203 mouzas and 198 inhabited villages. Gangarampur police station serves this block. Headquarters of this CD Block is at Gangarampur .

Gram panchayats of Gangrampur block/ panchayat samiti are: Asokgram, Basuria, Belbari I, Belbari II, Chaloon, Damdama, Gangarampur, Jahangirpur, Nandanpur, Sukdevpur and Uday.

== Demographics ==
=== Population ===
As per 2011 Census of India, Gangarampur CD Block had a total population of 237,628, of which 230,612 were rural and 7,016 were urban. There were 122,941 (52%) males and 114,687 (48%) females. Population below 6 years was 29,914. Scheduled Castes numbered 72,262 (30.41%) and Scheduled Tribes numbered 307 (0.13%).

As per 2001 census, Gangarampur block had a total population of 206,621, out of which 106,487 were males and 100,134 were females. Gangarampur block registered a population growth of 1.03 per cent during the 1991-2001 decade. Decadal growth for the district was 22.11 per cent.

The only census town in Gangarampur CD Block was (2011 population in brackets): Gopalpur (7,016).

Large villages (with 4,000+ population) in Gangarampur CD Block were (2011 population in brackets): Kathalhat Hosenpur (4,068), Narayanpur (5,883), Shukhdebpur (5,115), Patan (5,127), Jaypur (7,928) and Belbari (7,216).

Other villages in Gangarampur CD Block included (2011 population in brackets): Ashokgram (2,632), Gangarampur (1,396), Chalun (2,527), Uday (1,481), Jahangirpur (2,560) and Nandanpur (1,626).

Decadal growth of population in Gangarampur CD Block for the period 2001-2011 was 15.00%. Decadal growth of population in Dakhin Dinajpur district during the same period was 11.52% down from 22.15% in the previous decade. Decadal growth of population in West Bengal for the corresponding periods was 13.93% and 17.77% respectively.

The large scale migration of the East Bengali refugees (including tribals) started with the partition of Bengal in 1947. Up to around 1951, two-fifths of the refugees settled in South Bengal, the balance settled in the North Bengal districts of West Dinajpur, Jalpaiguri and Cooch Behar. Erstwhile West Dinajpur alone received around 6.5% of the early entrants. The steady flow of people into Dakshin Dinajpur has continued over the years from erstwhile East Pakistan and subsequently from Bangladesh.

=== Literacy ===
As per the 2011 census, the total number of literates in Gangarampur CD Block was 148,413 (71.45% of the population over 6 years) out of which males numbered 82,803 (77.03% of the male population over 6 years) and females numbered 65,610 (65.47% of the female population over 6 years). The gender disparity (the difference between female and male literacy rates) was 11.56%.

See also – List of West Bengal districts ranked by literacy rate

Literacy in CD blocks of
Dakshin Dinajpur district
Balurghat subdivision
Balurghat – 73.96%
Hili – 76.04%
Kumarganj – 74.57%
Tapan – 68.62%
Gangrampur subdivision
Bansihari – 68.79%
Gangarampur – 71.45%
Harirampur – 64.67%
Kushmandi – 65.43%
Source: 2011 Census: CD Block Wise
Primary Census Abstract Data

=== Language and religion ===
Religion in Gangarampur CD block (2011)
| Hinduism | 63.53% |
| Islam | 34.66% |
| Christianity | 1.65% |
| Other or not stated | 0.16% |

As per 2014 District Statistical Handbook: Dakshin Dinajpur (quoting census figures), in the 2001 census, in Gangrampur CD Block, Hindus numbered 131,549 and formed 63.66% of the population. Muslims numbered 71,164 and formed 34.44% of the population. Christians numbered 3,562 and formed 1.72% of the population. Others numbered 365 and formed 0.18% of the population. In the 2011 census, 150962 (50.19%) were Hindus and 82,360 (34.66%) Muslims, while 3917 were Christian.

According to the 2011 District Census Handbook: Dakshin Dinajpur, during 2011 census, majority of the population of the district were Hindus constituting 73.5% of the population followed by Muslims with 24.6% of the population. The proportion of Hindu population of the district increased from 59.9% in 1961 to 74.0 %in 2001 and then dropped to 73.5% in 2011. The proportion of Muslim population in the district decreased from 39.4% in 1961 to 24.0% in 2001 and then increased to 24.6% in 2011.

Languages of Gangarampur CD block (2011)
1. Bengali (86.8%)
2. Santali (8.79%)
3. Kurukh (1.31%)
4. Sadri (1.03%)
5. Others (2.02%)

At the time of the 2011 census, 86.85% of the population spoke Bengali, 8.79% Santali, 1.31% Kurukh and 1.03% Sadri as their first language.

== Rural poverty ==
As per the Human Development Report 2004 for West Bengal, the rural poverty ratio in erstwhile West Dinajpur district was 27.61%. Malda district on the south of West Dinajpur district had a rural poverty ratio of 35.4% and Jalpaiguri district on the north had a rural poverty ratio of 35.73%. These estimates were based on Central Sample data of NSS 55th round 1999–2000.

As per BPL Survey by the Government of West Bengal, the proportion of BPL families in Dakshin Dinajpur district was 43.54% as on 30 October 2002.

== Economy ==
=== Livelihood ===
Livelihood
in Gangarampur CD Block
1. Cultivators (28.8%)
2. Agricultural labourers (43.1%)
3. Household industries (5.33%)
4. Other Workers (22.7%)

In Gangarampur CD Block in 2011, amongst the class of total workers, cultivators numbered 27,941 and formed 28.82%, agricultural labourers numbered 41,817 and formed 43.13%, household industry workers numbered 5,167 and formed 5.33% and other workers numbered 22,024 and formed 22.72%. Total workers numbered 96,949 and formed 40.80% of the total population, and non-workers numbered 140,679 and formed 59.20% of the population.

Note: In the census records a person is considered a cultivator, if the person is engaged in cultivation/ supervision of land owned by self/government/institution. When a person who works on another person's land for wages in cash or kind or share, is regarded as an agricultural labourer. Household industry is defined as an industry conducted by one or more members of the family within the household or village, and one that does not qualify for registration as a factory under the Factories Act. Other workers are persons engaged in some economic activity other than cultivators, agricultural labourers and household workers. It includes factory, mining, plantation, transport and office workers, those engaged in business and commerce, teachers, entertainment artistes and so on.

=== Infrastructure ===
There are 198 inhabited villages in Gangrampur CD Block. All 198 villages (100%) have power supply. 195 villages (98.48%) have drinking water supply. 17 villages (8.59%) have post offices. 182 villages (91.82%) have telephones (including landlines, public call offices and mobile phones). 82 villages (41.41%) have a pucca (paved) approach road and 48 villages (24.24%) have transport communication (includes bus service, rail facility and navigable waterways). 12 villages (6.06%) have agricultural credit societies. 8 villages (4.04%) have banks.

=== Agriculture ===
The land is fertile for agricultural production, particularly in the southern part of the district. The rivers are flood-prone but droughts also occur occasionally. There are numerous tanks and some marshes and bils. Multiple cropping is widely practised. The Tebhaga movement by the share croppers, towards the end of British rule, is widely known. There are some forests, mostly in areas bordering Bangladesh.

Gangarampur CD Block had 256 fertiliser depots, 14 seed stores and 39 fair price shops in 2013–14.

In 2013–14, Gangarampur CD Block produced 62,971 tonnes of Aman paddy, the main winter crop from 23,945 hectares, 14,458 tonnes of Boro paddy (spring crop) from 4,448 hectares, 4 tonnes of Aus paddy (summer crop) from 2 hectares, 2,874 tonnes of wheat from 1,097 hectares, 36,120 tonnes of jute from 2,289 hectares and 24,217 tonnes of potatoes from 965 hectares. It also produced pulses and oilseeds.

In 2013–14, the total area irrigated in Gangarampur CD Block was 8,641 hectares, out of which 957 hectares were irrigated by tank irrigation, 5,084 hectares by river lift irrigation, 604 hectares by deep tube wells and 2,096 hectares by shallow tube wells.

=== Banking ===
In 2013–14, Gangarampur CD Block had offices of 8 commercial banks and 4 gramin banks.

=== Backward Regions Grant Fund ===
Dakshin Dinajpur district is listed as a backward region and receives financial support from the Backward Regions Grant Fund. The fund, created by the Government of India, is designed to redress regional imbalances in development. As of 2012, 272 districts across the country were listed under this scheme. The list includes 11 districts of West Bengal.

== Transport ==
Gangarmpur CD Block has 7 ferry services and 10 originating/ terminating bus routes.

The Eklakhi–Balurghat branch line passes through this CD Block and there is a station at Gangarampur.

State Highway 10 passes through this block.

== Education ==
In 2013–14, Gangarampur CD Block had 133 primary schools with 12,677 students, 18 middle schools with 1,579 students, 7 high schools with 22,224 students and 10 higher secondary schools with 25,527 students. Gangarampur CD Block had 1 technical/ professional institution with 100 students and 299 institutions for special and non-formal education with 9,410 students. There was a general degree college with 5,284 students at Gangarampur (outside the CD Block).

In Gangarampur CD Block, amongst the 198 inhabited villages, 51 villages do not have a school, 24 villages have more than 1 primary school, 29 villages have at least 1 primary and 1 middle school and 18 villages have at least 1 middle and 1 secondary school.

== Healthcare ==
In 2014, Gangrampur CD Block had 2 primary health centres and 2 private/ NGO nursing homes with total 37 beds and 1 doctor (excluding private bodies). It had 36 family welfare subcentres. 168,135 patients were treated outdoor in the hospitals, health centres and subcentres of the CD Block. Gangarampur has a hospital and 3 private/ NGO nursing homes with total 300 beds and 22 doctors (excluding private bodies) (outside the CD Block).

Mathurapur (Chalon) Block Primary Health Centre at PO Bansagar (with 10 beds) is the main medical facility in Gangarampur CD Block. There is a primary health centre at Sarbamangala (Sarbamangala (Bansuria) PHC) (with 10 beds).
