= Bansihari =

- Village
- Location in West Bengal, India Bansihari (India)
- Coordinates: 25.3897°N 88.4257°E
- Country: India
- State: West Bengal
- District: Dakshin Dinajpur

Population (2011)
  - Total: 930

Languages
  - Official: Bengali, English
- Time zone: UTC+5:30 (IST)
- PIN: 733121 (Cheragipara)
- STD/ Telephone code: 03521
- Lok Sabha constituency: Balurghat
- Vidhan Sabha constituency: Harirampur
- Website: ddinajpur.nic.in

Bansihari is a village in Bansihari CD Block in Gangarampur subdivision of Dakshin Dinajpur district in the state of West Bengal, India.

== Geography ==
Cities and towns in the Dakshin Dinajpur district
M: municipal city/ town, CT: census town, R: rural/ urban centre, H: historical site
Owing to space constraints in the small map, the actual locations in a larger map may vary slightly

=== Location ===
Bansihari is located at 25.3897°N 88.4257°E.

The Tangon flows nearby.

In the map alongside, all places marked on the map are linked in the full screen version.

=== Police station ===
Bansihari police station under West Bengal police has jurisdiction over Bansihari CD Block.

== Demographics ==
As per the 2011 Census of India, Bansihari had a total population of 930, of which 475 (51%) were males and 455 (49%) were females. Population below 6 years was 125. The total number of literates in Bansihari was 685 (85.09% of the population over 6 years).

== Transport ==
Bansihari is located off the State Highway 10.

== Education ==
Bansihari High School was established at Shibpur, an adjacent village, in 1952. It is a Bengali-medium co-educational higher secondary school. It has arrangements for teaching from Class V to XII. It has 14 computers, 1,350 books in the library and a playground. Mid-day meals are prepared and served in the school.
