= Bansihari (community development block) =

Banshihari
- Community development block
- Coordinates: 25.4000°N 88.4167°E
- Country: India
- State: West Bengal
- District: Dakshin Dinajpur

Government
  - Type: Block

Area
  - Total: 197.50 km^{2} (76.26 sq mi)

Population (2011)
  - Total: 141,286
  - Density: 715.37/km^{2} (1,852.8/sq mi)

Languages
  - Official: Bengali, English
- Time zone: UTC+5:30 (IST)
- PIN: 733121
- Lok Sabha constituency: Balurghat
- Vidhan Sabha constituency: Harirampur
- Website: ddinajpur.nic.in

Banshihari is a community development block that forms an administrative division in Gangarampur Subdivision of Dakshin Dinajpur District in the Indian state of West Bengal.

== History ==
Dinajpur district was constituted in 1786. In 1947, the Radcliffe Line placed the Sadar and Thakurgaon subdivisions of Dinajpur district in East Pakistan. The Balurghat subdivision of Dinajpur district was reconstituted as West Dinajpur district in West Bengal. The new Raiganj subdivision was formed in 1948. In order to restore territorial links between northern and southern parts of West Bengal which had been snapped during the partition of Bengal, and on the recommendations of the States Reorganisation Commission a portion of the erstwhile Kishanganj subdivision comprising Goalpokhar, Islampur and Chopra thanas (police stations) and parts of Thakurganj thana, along with the adjacent parts of the erstwhile Gopalpur thana in Katihar subdivision were transferred from Purnea district in Bihar to West Bengal in 1956, and were formally incorporated into Raiganj subdivision in West Dinajpur. The township of Kishanganj and its entire municipal boundary remained within Bihar. With the introduction of the Community Development Programme in 1960-61, community development blocks were set up in West Dinajpur district. In 1992, West Dinajpur district was bifurcated and Dakshin Dinajpur district was established.

== Geography ==
Banshihari is located at 25°24′00″N 88°25′00″E.

Dakshin Dinajpur district is physiographically a part of the Barind Tract. The area is generally flat and slightly undulating. The elevation of the district is about 15 metres above mean sea level. However, the soil varies. CD Blocks such as Balurghat, Hili and Kumarganj have alluvial soil, Tapan CD Block has laterite soil. There are three main rivers. The Atreyee comes from Bangladesh, flows through Kumarganj and Balurghat CD Blocks and goes back to Bangladesh. The Punarbhaba flows through Gangarampur and Tapan CD Blocks. The Tangon flows through Kushmandi and Bansihari CD Blocks. There is a small river named Jamuna in the Hili CD Block. All rivers, flowing from north to south, overflow during the monsoons and cause floods.

Bansihari CD Block is bounded by Kushmandi CD Block on the north, Gangrampur and Tapan CD Blocks on the east, Bamangola and Gazole CD Blocks in Malda district on the south and Harirampur CD Block on the west,

Bansihari CD Block has an area of 196.52 km^{2}.It has 1 panchayat samity, 4 gram panchayats, 97 gram sansads (village councils), 161 mouzas and 160 inhabited villages. Bansihari police station serves this block. Headquarters of this CD Block is in Buniadpur.Buniadpur is a City & Municipality

Gram panchayats of Banshihari Block/ panchayat samiti are: Brojoballavpur, Ellahabad, Ganguria and Mahabari.

== Demographics ==
=== Population ===
As per 2011 Census of India, Bansihari CD Block had a total population of 141,286, all of which were rural. There were 72,161 (51%) males and 69,125 (49%) females. Population below 6 years was 17,179. Scheduled Castes numbered 17,506 (12.39%) and Scheduled Tribes numbered 31,017 (21.95%).

As per 2001 census Bansihari block had a population of 122,091 of which 62,534 are males and 59,557 are females.

Large villages (with 4,000+ population) in Bansihari CD Block were (2011 population in brackets): Elahabad (4,220) and Bagduar (4,003).

City & Municipality - Buniadpur is the main City and a Municipality of Banshihari Block. Buniadpur is the Headquarter of Banshihari Block & a Sub-divisional town of Gangarampur Sub- Division.

Decadal growth of population in Bansihari CD Block for the period 2001-2011 was 15.72%. Decadal growth of population in Dakhin Dinajpur district during the same period was 11.52% down from 22.15% in the previous decade. Decadal growth of population in West Bengal for the corresponding periods was 13.93% and 17.77% respectively.

The large scale migration of the East Bengali refugees (including tribals) started with the partition of Bengal in 1947. Up to around 1951, two-fifths of the refugees settled in South Bengal, the balance settled in the North Bengal districts of West Dinajpur, Jalpaiguri and Cooch Behar. Erstwhile West Dinajpur alone received around 6.5% of the early entrants. The steady flow of people into Dakshin Dinajpur has continued over the years from erstwhile East Pakistan and subsequently from Bangladesh.

=== Literacy ===
As per the 2011 census, the total number of literates in Bansihari CD Block was 85,368 (68.79% of the population over 6 years) out of which males numbered 47,721 (75.21% of the male population over 6 years) and females numbered 37,647 (62.06% of the female population over 6 years). The gender disparity (the difference between female and male literacy rates) was 13.15%.

See also – List of West Bengal districts ranked by literacy rate

Literacy in CD blocks of
Dakshin Dinajpur district
Balurghat subdivision
Balurghat – 73.96%
Hili – 76.04%
Kumarganj – 74.57%
Tapan – 68.62%
Gangrampur subdivision
Bansihari – 68.79%
Gangarampur – 71.45%
Harirampur – 64.67%
Kushmandi – 65.43%
Source: 2011 Census: CD Block Wise
Primary Census Abstract Data

=== Language and religion ===
Religion in Bansihari CD block (2011)
Hinduism	73.82%
Islam	23.93%
Christianity	1.97%
Other or not stated	0.28%

As per 2014 District Statistical Handbook: Dakshin Dinajpur (quoting census figures), in the 2001 census, in Bansihari CD Block, Hindus numbered 90.339 and formed 73.99% of the population. Muslims numbered 29,554 and formed 24.21% of the population. Christians numbered 1,662 and formed 1.36% of the population. Others numbered 536 and formed 0.44% of the population. In the 2011 census, 104,294 (73.82%) were Hindus and 33,815 (23.93%) Muslims, while 2,785 were Christian.

According to the 2011 District Census Handbook: Dakshin Dinajpur, during 2011 census, majority of the population of the district were Hindus constituting 73.5% of the population followed by Muslims with 24.6% of the population. The proportion of Hindu population of the district increased from 59.9% in 1961 to 74.0 %in 2001 and then dropped to 73.5% in 2011. The proportion of Muslim population in the district decreased from 39.4% in 1961 to 24.0% in 2001 and then increased to 24.6% in 2011.

Languages of Bansihari CD block (2011)
1. Bengali (76.7%)
2. Santali (15.8%)
3. 'Other' Bengali (2.28%)
4. Kurmali (1.20%)
5. Others (4.07%)

At the time of the 2011 census, 76.69% of the population spoke Bengali, 15.76% Santali and 1.20% Kurmali as their first language. 2.28% of the population recorded their language as 'Others' under Bengali.

== Rural poverty ==
As per the Human Development Report 2004 for West Bengal, the rural poverty ratio in erstwhile West Dinajpur district was 27.61%. Malda district on the south of West Dinajpur district had a rural poverty ratio of 35.4% and Jalpaiguri district on the north had a rural poverty ratio of 35.73%. These estimates were based on Central Sample data of NSS 55th round 1999-2000.

As per BPL Survey by the Government of West Bengal, the proportion of BPL families in Dakshin Dinajpur district was 43.54% as on 30 October 2002.

== Economy ==
=== Livelihood ===
Livelihood
in Bansihari CD Block
1. Cultivators (30.6%)
2. Agricultural labourers (45.5%)
3. Household industries (2.68%)
4. Other Workers (21.1%)

In Bansihari CD Block in 2011, amongst the class of total workers, cultivators numbered 17,727 and formed 30.65%, agricultural labourers numbered 26,341 and formed 45.54%, household industry workers numbered 1,549 and formed 2.68% and other workers numbered 12,221 and formed 21.13%. Total workers numbered 57,838 and formed 40.94% of the total population, and non-workers numbered 83,448 and formed 59.66% of the population.

Note: In the census records a person is considered a cultivator, if the person is engaged in cultivation/ supervision of land owned by self/government/institution. When a person who works on another person's land for wages in cash or kind or share, is regarded as an agricultural labourer. Household industry is defined as an industry conducted by one or more members of the family within the household or village, and one that does not qualify for registration as a factory under the Factories Act. Other workers are persons engaged in some economic activity other than cultivators, agricultural labourers and household workers. It includes factory, mining, plantation, transport and office workers, those engaged in business and commerce, teachers, entertainment artistes and so on.

=== Infrastructure ===
There are 160 inhabited villages in Bansihari CD Block. All 160 villages (100%) have power supply. 158 villages (98.75%) have drinking water supply. 6 villages (3.75%) have post offices. 159 villages (99.38%) have telephones (including landlines, public call offices and mobile phones). 76 villages (47.5%) have a pucca (paved) approach road and 35 villages (21.88%) have transport communication (includes bus service, rail facility and navigable waterways). 23 villages (14.37%) have agricultural credit societies. 9 villages (5.62%) have banks.

=== Agriculture ===
The land is fertile for agricultural production, particularly in the southern part of the district. The rivers are flood-prone but droughts also occur occasionally. There are numerous tanks and some marshes and bils. Multiple cropping is widely practised. The Tebhaga movement by the share croppers, towards the end of British rule, is widely known. There are some forests, mostly in areas bordering Bangladesh.

Bansihari CD Block had 160 fertiliser depots, 12 seed stores and 25 fair price shops in 2013-14.

In 2013-14, Bansihari CD Block produced 117,344 tonnes of Aman paddy, the main winter crop from 43,350 hectares, 4,207 tonnes of Boro paddy (spring crop) from 1,321 hectares, 277 tonnes of Aus paddy (summer crop) from 149 hectares, 3,416 tonnes of wheat from 958 hectares, 17,371 tonnes of jute from 1,189 hectares and 34,054 tonnes of potatoes from 1,193 hectares. It also produced pulses and oilseeds.

In 2013-14, the total area irrigated in Bansihari CD Block was 4,285 hectares, out of which 882 hectares were irrigated by tank irrigation, 1,158 hectares by river lift irrigation, 721 hectares by deep tube wells and 1,524 hectares by shallow tube wells.

=== Banking ===
In 2013-14, Bansihari CD Block had offices of 3 commercial banks and 4 gramin banks.

=== Backward Regions Grant Fund ===
Dakshin Dinajpur district is listed as a backward region and receives financial support from the Backward Regions Grant Fund. The fund, created by the Government of India, is designed to redress regional imbalances in development. As of 2012, 272 districts across the country were listed under this scheme. The list includes 11 districts of West Bengal.

== Transport ==
Bansihari CD Block has 3 ferry services and 10 originating/ terminating bus routes.

The Eklakhi–Balurghat branch line passes through this CD Block and there are stations at Buniadpur and Daulatpur Hat.

New broad gauge lines – Gazole-Itahar (27.20 km), Itahar-Raiganj (22.16 km) and Itahar-Buniadpur (27.095 km) – as a material modification of the Eklakhi-Balurghat project (commissioned in 2004) was included in the budget 1983-84. Initial work for the lines has been taken up by Northeast Frontier Railway. 431.973 ha of land to be acquired. Land acquisition has commenced in the Gazole-Itahar sector with initial fund sanctions. As of August 2018, further sanctions are awaited.

New broad gauge line from Kaliaganj to Buniadpur (33.10 km) was included in the budget 2010-11. 157.938 ha of land to be acquired. As of August 2018, project work by Northeast Frontier Railway held up mainly because of paucity of funds.

State Highway 10 and State Highway 10A pass through this block.

== Education ==
In 2013-14, Bansihari CD Block had 78 primary schools with 7,342 students, 10 middle school with 1,115 students, 6 high schools with 16,980 students and 11 higher secondary schools with 8,861 students. Bansihari CD Block had 1 general degree college with 132 students and 266 institutions for special and non-formal education with 10,618 students.

In Bansihari CD Block, amongst the 160 inhabited villages, 55 villages do not have a school, 17 villages have more than 1 primary school, 24 villages have at least 1 primary and 1 middle school and 16 villages have at least 1 middle and 1 secondary school.

Buniadpur Mahavidyalaya was established at Buniadpur in 2007. Buniadpur was earlier in Bansihari CD Block. In 2015, Buniadpur became a municipal town and since then it is outside the CD Block.

== Healthcare ==
In 2014, Bansihari CD Block had 1 rural hospital, 1 primary health centre and 1 private/ NGO nursing home, with total 46 beds and 6 doctors (excluding private bodies). It had 19 family welfare subcentres. 5,155 patients were treated indoor and 193,837 patients were treated outdoor in the hospitals, health centres and subcentres of the CD Block.

Rashidpur Rural Hospital at Rashidpur (with 30 beds) is the main medical facility in Bansihari CD Block. There is a primary health centre at Badalpur (with 10 beds).
