= Chauliapatty =

Village in Dinajpur District, Bangladesh

Coordinates: 25.6305°N 88.6236°E

Chaulia Patty (Bengali: চাউলিয়াপট্টি) is a mahalla (also called village) by the Punarbhaba River in Dinajpur District, Bangladesh.
