= Rafikul Islam =

Indian politician

Member of the West Bengal Legislative Assembly
- In office 2016–2021
- Preceded by: Biplab Mitra
- Succeeded by: Biplab Mitra
- Constituency: Harirampur

Personal details
- Born: 1956 (age 69–70) Harirampur, West Dinajpur district, West Bengal
- Party: Communist Party of India (Marxist)

Rafikul Islam (born 1956) is an Indian farmer, social worker and politician belonging to the Communist Party of India (Marxist).

== Early life and education ==
Islam was born in 1956 to a Bengali Muslim family in Harirampur, West Dinajpur district, West Bengal. He is the son of Shamsher Ali and passed his Higher Secondary Certificate from the Harirampur Abdus Sobhan Dewan Mahammad High School.

== Career ==
Islam was elected to the Harirampur Assembly constituency at the West Bengal Legislative Assembly following the 2016 West Bengal Legislative Assembly election where he contested as a Communist Party of India (Marxist) candidate and defeated former MLA and Trinamool politician Biplab Mitra. He contested in the 2021 West Bengal Legislative Assembly election but lost to Mitra.
