= Nahit, West Bengal =

Village in West Bengal

Nahit Uttar Nahit
- Village
- Location within West Bengal Location within India
- Coordinates: 25°32′25.01″N 88°24′44.29″E
- Country: India
- State: West Bengal
- District: Dakshin Dinajpur

Area
  - Total: 4,369 km^{2} (1,687 sq mi)

Population (2011)
  - Total: 4,630
  - Male: 2,295
  - Female: 2,335

Muslims = 35% ▲ Hindus = 60% Others (Christian, Sikh, Buddhists) = 0%

Languages
  - Official: Bengali, English
- Time zone: UTC+5:30 (IST)
- PIN: 733132
- Telephone Code: 03524
- Vehicle registration: WB
- Climate: Moderate, Comfortable (Köppen)
- Lok Sabha constituency: Balurghat
- Nearest city: Kushmandi
- Website: ddinajpur.nic.in

Nahit (Included Uttar Nahit) is a village located in Kushmandi subdivision of Dakshin Dinajpur district in West Bengal, India.

== Location ==
It is situated 4.4 km (2.7 mi) from sub-district headquarters Kushmandi. Balurghat is the district headquarters of this village. Karanji is the gram panchayat of this village. The total geographical area of the village is 436.9 hectares (1,080 acres; 4.369 km^{2}). The village code of this village is 310441.

== Population ==
With about 972 houses, this village has a total population of 4630 people amongst them are 2295 male and 2335 female and a total geographical area of 436.9 hectares (1,080 acres) or 4.369 km^{2}.

== See also ==
- Kushmandi
