= Gopalpur, Dakshin Dinajpur =

Gopalpur
- Census Town
- Location in West Bengal, India Gopalpur (India)
- Coordinates: 25.3636°N 88.5251°E
- Country: India
- State: West Bengal
- District: Dakshin Dinajpur

Population (2011)
  - Total: 7,016

Languages
  - Official: Bengali, English
- Time zone: UTC+5:30 (IST)
- Telephone code: 03524
- Vehicle registration: WB
- Lok Sabha constituency: Balurghat
- Vidhan Sabha constituency: Gangrampur
- Website: ddinajpur.nic.in

Gopalpur is a census town in Gangarampur CD Block in Gangarampur subdivision of Dakshin Dinajpur district in the state of West Bengal, India.

== Geography ==
Cities and towns in the Dakshin Dinajpur district
M: municipal city/ town, CT: census town, R: rural/ urban centre, H: historical site
Owing to space constraints in the small map, the actual locations in a larger map may vary slightly

=== Location ===
Gopalpur is located at 25.3636°N 88.5251°E.

In the map alongside, all places marked on the map are linked in the full screen version.

== Demographics ==
As per the 2011 Census of India, Gopalpur had a total population of 7,016, of which 3,883 (51%) were males and 3,433 (49%) were females. Population below 6 years was 615. The total number of literates in Gopalpur was 4,964 (77.55% of the population over 6 years).

== Transport ==
Gopalpur is on Gangarampur-Tapan main road.
