= Harirampur (community development block) =

- Community development block
- Coordinates: 25.37425°N 88.267792°E
- Country: India
- State: West Bengal
- District: Dakshin Dinajpur

Government
  - Type: Community development block

Area
  - Total: 214.88 km^{2} (82.97 sq mi)

Population (2011)
  - Total: 136,853
  - Density: 636.88/km^{2} (1,649.5/sq mi)

Languages
  - Official: Bengali, English
- Time zone: UTC+5:30 (IST)
- Vehicle registration: WB
- Lok Sabha constituency: Balurghat
- Vidhan Sabha constituency: Harirampur
- Website: ddinajpur.nic.in

Harirampur is a community development block that forms an administrative division in Gangarampur subdivision of Dakshin Dinajpur district in the Indian state of West Bengal.

== History ==
Dinajpur district was constituted in 1786. In 1947, the Radcliffe Line placed the Sadar and Thakurgaon subdivisions of Dinajpur district in East Pakistan. The Balurghat subdivision of Dinajpur district was reconstituted as West Dinajpur district in West Bengal. The new Raiganj subdivision was formed in 1948. In order to restore territorial links between northern and southern parts of West Bengal which had been snapped during the partition of Bengal, and on the recommendations of the States Reorganisation Commission a portion of the erstwhile Kishanganj subdivision comprising Goalpokhar, Islampur and Chopra thanas (police stations) and parts of Thakurganj thana, along with the adjacent parts of the erstwhile Gopalpur thana in Katihar subdivision were transferred from Purnea district in Bihar to West Bengal in 1956, and were formally incorporated into Raiganj subdivision in West Dinajpur. The township of Kishanganj and its entire municipal boundary remained within Bihar. With the introduction of the Community Development Programme in 1960-61, community development blocks were set up in West Dinajpur district. In 1992, West Dinajpur district was bifurcated and Dakshin Dinajpur district was established.

== Geography ==
Harirampur is located at 25°22′27″N 88°16′04″E.

Dakshin Dinajpur district is physiographically a part of the Barind Tract. The area is generally flat and slightly undulating. The elevation of the district is about 15 metres above mean sea level. However, the soil varies. CD Blocks such as Balurghat, Hili and Kumarganj have alluvial soil, Tapan CD Block has laterite soil. There are three main rivers. The Atreyee comes from Bangladesh, flows through Kumarganj and Balurghat CD Blocks and goes back to Bangladesh. The Punarbhaba flows through Gangarampur and Tapan CD Blocks. The Tangon flows through Kushmandi and Bansihari CD Blocks. There is a small river named Jamuna in the Hili CD Block. All rivers, flowing from north to south, overflow during the monsoons and cause floods.

Harirampur CD Block is bounded by Kushmandi CD Block on the north, Bansihari CD Block on the east, Gazole CD Block on a part of the south, Itahar CD Block in Uttar Dinajpur district on the rest of the south and the west.

Harirampur CD Block has an area of 214.94 km^{2}.It has 1 panchayat samiti, 6 gram panchayats, 98 gram sansads (village councils), 155 mouzas and 144 inhabited villages. Harirampur police station serves this block. Headquarters of this CD Block is at Harirampur.

Gram panchayats of Harirampur block/ panchayat samiti are: Bagichapur, Bairhatta, Gokarna, Pundari, Saiyadpur and Sirsi.

== Demographics ==
=== Population ===
As per 2011 Census of India, Harirampur CD Block had a total population of 136,853, of which 131,832 were rural and 5,021 were urban. There were 69,058 (50%) males and 67,795 (50%) females. Population below 6 years was 19,389. Scheduled Castes numbered 29,853 (21.81%) and Scheduled Tribes numbered 25,053 (16.85%).

As per 2001 census Harirampur block had a population of 124,927 of which 63,595 are males and 61,332 are females.

The only census town in Harirampur CD Block was (2011 population in brackets): Harirampur (5,021).

Large villages (with 4,000+ population) in Harirampur CD Block were (2011 population in brackets): Mahindra (4,682) and Purba Saiyadpur (4,945).

Other villages in Harirampur CD Block included (2011 population in brackets): Gokarna (931), Shirsi (1,868), Bagichapur (1,712), Bairhatta (2,639) and Pundari (1,863).

Decadal growth of population in Harirampur CD Block for the period 2001-2011 was 9.56%. Decadal growth of population in Dakhin Dinajpur district during the same period was 11.52% down from 22.15% in the previous decade. Decadal growth of population in West Bengal for the corresponding periods was 13.93% and 17.77% respectively.

The large scale migration of the East Bengali refugees (including tribals) started with the partition of Bengal in 1947. Up to around 1951, two-fifths of the refugees settled in South Bengal, the balance settled in the North Bengal districts of West Dinajpur, Jalpaiguri and Cooch Behar. Erstwhile West Dinajpur alone received around 6.5% of the early entrants. The steady flow of people into Dakshin Dinajpur has continued over the years from erstwhile East Pakistan and subsequently from Bangladesh.

=== Literacy ===
As per the 2011 census, the total number of literates in Harirampur CD Block was 76,099 (64.67% of the population over 6 years) out of which males numbered 42,335 (71.45% of the male population over 6 years) and females numbered 33,764 (58.00% of the female population over 6 years). The gender disparity (the difference between female and male literacy rates) was 13.45%.

See also – List of West Bengal districts ranked by literacy rate

Literacy in CD blocks of
Dakshin Dinajpur district
Balurghat subdivision
Balurghat – 73.96%
Hili – 76.04%
Kumarganj – 74.57%
Tapan – 68.62%
Gangrampur subdivision
Bansihari – 68.79%
Gangarampur – 71.45%
Harirampur – 64.67%
Kushmandi – 65.43%
Source: 2011 Census: CD Block Wise
Primary Census Abstract Data

=== Language and religion ===
Religion in Harirampur CD block (2011)
Hinduism	50.19%
Islam	49.00%
Christianity	0.65%
Other or not stated	0.16%

As per 2014 District Statistical Handbook: Dakshin Dinajpur (quoting census figures), in the 2001 census, in Harirampur CD Block, Hindus numbered 61,987 and formed 49.62% of the population. Muslims numbered 59,935 and formed 47.98% of the population. Christians numbered 952 and formed 1.64% of the population. Others numbered 2,053 and formed 1.64% of the population. In the 2011 census, 68,684 (50.19%) were Hindus and 67,052 (49.00%) Muslims, while 890 were Christian.

Languages of Harirampur CD block (2011)
1. Bengali (83.8%)
2. Santali (12.8%)
3. Hindi (1.64%)
4. Others (1.69%)

At the time of the 2011 census, 83.84% of the population spoke Bengali, 12.83% Santali and 1.64% Hindi as their first language.

== Rural poverty ==
As per the Human Development Report 2004 for West Bengal, the rural poverty ratio in erstwhile West Dinajpur district was 27.61%. Malda district on the south of West Dinajpur district had a rural poverty ratio of 35.4% and Jalpaiguri district on the north had a rural poverty ratio of 35.73%. These estimates were based on Central Sample data of NSS 55th round 1999-2000.

As per BPL Survey by the Government of West Bengal, the proportion of BPL families in Dakshin Dinajpur district was 43.54% as on 30 October 2002.

== Economy ==
=== Livelihood ===
Livelihood
in Harirampur CD Block
1. Cultivators (28.6%)
2. Agricultural labourers (49.9%)
3. Household industries (4.57%)
4. Other Workers (16.9%)

In Harirampur CD Block in 2011, amongst the class of total workers, cultivators numbered 15,811 and formed 28.63%, agricultural labourers numbered 27,561 and formed 49.88%, household industry workers numbered 2,523 and formed 4.57% and other workers numbered 9,345 and formed 16.92%. Total workers numbered 55,230 and formed 40.36% of the total population, and non-workers numbered 81,623 and formed 59.64% of the population.

Note: In the census records a person is considered a cultivator, if the person is engaged in cultivation/ supervision of land owned by self/government/institution. When a person who works on another person's land for wages in cash or kind or share, is regarded as an agricultural labourer. Household industry is defined as an industry conducted by one or more members of the family within the household or village, and one that does not qualify for registration as a factory under the Factories Act. Other workers are persons engaged in some economic activity other than cultivators, agricultural labourers and household workers. It includes factory, mining, plantation, transport and office workers, those engaged in business and commerce, teachers, entertainment artistes and so on.

=== Infrastructure ===
There are 144 inhabited villages in Harirampur CD Block. All 144 villages (100%) have power supply. All 144 villages (100%) have drinking water supply. 12 villages (8.33%) have post offices. 125 villages (86.81%) have telephones (including landlines, public call offices and mobile phones). 60 villages (41.67%) have a pucca (paved) approach road and 24 villages (16.67%) have transport communication (includes bus service, rail facility and navigable waterways). 5 villages (3.47%) have agricultural credit societies. 5 villages (3.47%) have banks.

=== Agriculture ===
The land is fertile for agricultural production, particularly in the southern part of the district. The rivers are flood-prone but droughts also occur occasionally. There are numerous tanks and some marshes and bils. Multiple cropping is widely practised. The Tebhaga movement by the share croppers, towards the end of British rule, is widely known. There are some forests, mostly in areas bordering Bangladesh.

Harirampur CD Block had 124 fertiliser depots, 10 seed stores and 35 fair price shops in 2013-14.

In 2013-14, Harirampur CD Block produced 3,082 tonnes of Aman paddy, the main winter crop from 1,221 hectares, 9,485 tonnes of Boro paddy (spring crop) from 3,059 hectares, 14,112 tonnes of wheat from 4,291 hectares, 9,856 tonnes of jute from 800 hectares and 2,561 tonnes of potatoes from 110 hectares. It also produced pulses and oilseeds.

In 2013-14, the total area irrigated in Harirampur CD Block was 3,428 hectares, out of which 1,343 hectares were irrigated by tank irrigation, 18 hectares by river lift irrigation, 459 hectares by deep tube wells and 1,608 hectares by shallow tube wells.

=== Banking ===
In 2013-14, Harirampur CD Block had offices of 4 commercial banks and 2 gramin banks.

=== Backward Regions Grant Fund ===
Dakshin Dinajpur district is listed as a backward region and receives financial support from the Backward Regions Grant Fund. The fund, created by the Government of India, is designed to redress regional imbalances in development. As of 2012, 272 districts across the country were listed under this scheme. The list includes 11 districts of West Bengal.

== Transport ==
Harirampur CD Block has 9 originating/ terminating bus routes. The nearest railway station is 14 km from the CD Block headquarters.

== Education ==
In 2013-14, Harirampur CD Block had 92 primary schools with 9,831 students, 13 middle school with 914 students, 7 high schools with 13,277 students and 8 higher secondary schools with 12,018 students. Harirampur CD Block had 1 general degree college with 1,684 students and 239 institutions for special and non-formal education with 11,488 students.

In Harirampur CD Block, amongst the 144 inhabited villages, 43 villages do not have a school, 15 villages have more than 1 primary school, 26 villages have at least 1 primary and 1 middle school and 15 villages have at least 1 middle and 1 secondary school.

Dewan Abdul Gani College was established at Harirampur in 1994.

== Healthcare ==
In 2014, Harirampur CD Block had 1 rural hospital and 1 primary health centre, with total 42 beds and 6 doctors (excluding private bodies). It had 19 family welfare subcentres. 4,363 patients were treated indoor and 185,753 patients were treated outdoor in the hospitals, health centres and subcentres of the CD Block.

Harirampur Rural Hospital at Harirampur (with 30 beds) is the main medical facility in Harirampur CD Block. There is a primary health centre at Balihara (with 10 beds).

== Notable people ==
- Rafikul Islam, MLA of Harirampur
