= Biplab Mitra =

Indian politician

Minister of Consumer Affairs Government of west bangal
- In office 10 May 2021 – 7 May 2026
- Governor: La. Ganesan; C. V. Ananda Bose; R. N. Ravi
- Chief minister: Mamata Banerjee
- Preceded by: Sadhan pande

Member of the West Bengal Legislative Assembly
- Incumbent
- Assumed office 14 May 2011
- Preceded by: Rafikul Islam
- Constituency: Harirampur

Personal details
- Party: All India Trinamool Congress (until 2026); Democratic Trinamool Congress (from 2026)
- Other political affiliations: Bharatiya Janata Party

Biplab Mitra is an Indian politician and the Ex-Minister of Consumer Affairs in the Government of West Bengal. He has been elected twice as a Member of the West Bengal Legislative Assembly, representing the Harirampur Assembly constituency in 2011 and 2021 as a member of TMC party.

== Political career ==
In the 2011 West Bengal Legislative Assembly election, Mitra contested as a candidate for the All India Trinamool Congress. He faced Communist Party of India (Marxist) candidate Narayan Biswas and won by a margin of 7,067 votes, securing a total of 65,099 votes, while Biswas received 58,032 votes.

In the 2016 West Bengal Legislative Assembly election, Mitra again received the TMC ticket and contested against CPI(M)’s new candidate, Rafikul Islam. This time, he lost by a narrow margin of 4,504 votes, with Mitra receiving 66,943 votes and Islam securing 71,447 votes.

In June 2019, Mitra left All India Trinamool Congress and joined BJP after the Lok Sabha polls. In July 2020, he left the BJP and rejoined the All India Trinamool Congress.

In the 2021 West Bengal Legislative Assembly election, Mitra again got the ticket from TMC and contested from the Harirampur Assembly constituency and defeated BJP candidate Nilanjan Roy by a margin of 22,672 votes, securing his position as a Member of the Legislative Assembly. Mitra received a total of 96,131 votes, while Roy received 73,459 votes.

In 10 March 2024, TMC announced his name as a candidate the 2024 Lok Sabha Election in India from Balurghat Lok Sabha constrituency. Mitra contested the election against BJP candidate Sukanta Majumdar, who had previously won the constituency by defeating Arpita Ghosh. Mitra lost the election by a narrow margin of 10,386 votes, receiving a total of 564,610 votes, while Majumdar received 574,996 votes.
