= Amlahar =

Village in West Bengal

- Village
- Location within West Bengal Location within India
- Coordinates: 25°27′29.39″N 88°23′55.54″E
- Country: India
- State: West Bengal
- District: Dakshin Dinajpur

Area
  - Total: 1.4858 km^{2} (0.5737 sq mi)

Population (2011)
  - Total: 1,069
  - Male: 551
  - Female: 518

Muslims = 100% ▲ Hindus = 0% Others (Christian, Sikh, Buddhists) = 0%

Languages
  - Official: Bengali, English
- Time zone: UTC+5:30 (IST)
- PIN: 733121
- Telephone Code: 03524
- Vehicle registration: WB
- Climate: Moderate, Comfortable (Köppen)
- Lok Sabha constituency: Balurghat
- Nearest city: Buniadpur
- Website: ddinajpur.nic.in

Amlahar is a small village located in Kushmandi subdivision of Dakshin Dinajpur district in West Bengal, India.[1]

== Location ==
It is situated 8.5 km (5.3 mi) from sub-district headquarters Buniadpur. Balurghat is the district headquarters of this village. Kalikamora is the gram panchayat of this village. The total geographical area of the village is 148.58 hectares (367.1 acres; 1.4858 km^{2}). The village code of this village is 310470.

== Population ==
With about 269 houses, this village has a total population of 1,069 people amongst them are 551 male and 518 female and a total geographical area of 148.58 hectares (367.1 acres) or 1.4858 km^{2}. The literacy rate of the total population of this village is 61.83% among 65.52% males and 57.92% females are literate.

== See also ==
- Abuhar village in Dakshin Dinajpur.
- Kalikamora village in Dakshin Dinajpur.
