= Harirampur, West Bengal =

Harirampur
- Census town
- Location in West Bengal, India Harirampur (India)
- Coordinates: 25.3786°N 88.2677°E
- Country: India
- State: West Bengal
- District: Dakshin Dinajpur

Population (2011)
  - Total: 5,021

Languages
  - Official: Bengali, English
- Time zone: UTC+5:30 (IST)
- PIN: 733125
- STD/ Telephone code: 03524
- Lok Sabha constituency: Balurghat
- Vidhan Sabha constituency: Harirampur
- Website: ddinajpur.nic.in

Harirampur is a census town in Harirampur CD Block in Gangarampur subdivision of Dakshin Dinajpur district in the state of West Bengal, India.

== Geography ==
Cities and towns in the Dakshin Dinajpur district
M: municipal city/ town, CT: census town, R: rural/ urban centre, H: historical site
Owing to space constraints in the small map, the actual locations in a larger map may vary slightly

=== Location ===
Harirampur is located at 25.3786°N 88.2677°E.

In the map alongside, all places marked on the map are linked in the full screen version.

=== Police station ===
Harirampur police station under West Bengal police has jurisdiction over Harirampur CD Block.

=== CD Block HQ ===
The headquarters of Harirampur CD Block is at Harirampur.

== Demographics ==
As per the 2011 Census of India, Harirampur had a total population of 5,021, of which 2,569 (51%) were males and 2,452 (49%) were females. Population below 6 years was 487. The total number of literates in Harirampur was 3,780 (83.37% of the population over 6 years).

== Transport ==
The Harirampur-Daulatpur Road links Harirampur with State Highway 10. The nearest railway station is at Daulatpur Hat on the Eklakhi–Balurghat branch line.

New broad gauge lines – Gazole-Itahar (27.20 km), Itahar-Raiganj (22.16 km) and Itahar-Buniadpur (27.095 km) – as a material modification of the Eklakhi-Balurghat project (commissioned in 2004) was included in the budget 1983–84. Initial work for the lines has been taken up by Northeast Frontier Railway. 431.973 ha of land to be acquired. Land acquisition has commenced in the Gazole-Itahar sector with initial fund sanctions. As of August 2018, further sanctions are awaited. The Itahar-Buniadpur line will pass through Harirampur.

== Education ==
Dewan Abdul Gani College was established at Harirampur in 1994. It is affiliated with the University of Gour Banga and offers honours courses in Bengali, English, history, geography, philosophy and political science, and a general course in arts. Government ITI Harirampur .This small town has two high schools and one girls' school. The two high schools are named Harirampur A.S.D.M High School(H.S) and the other one is Betna Ramakrishnapur High School.

== Healthcare ==
Harirampur Rural Hospital at Harirampur (with 30 beds) is the main medical facility in Harirampur CD Block. There is a primary health centre at Balihara (with 10 beds).

There is a Block Animal Health Center at Harirampur, run by Animal Resources Development of Govt of WestBengal for animal health care along with 5 ADAC at Pundari, Saiyedpur (Balihara), Gokarna, Bairhatta and Shirshi Gram panchayat.

== Agriculture ==
Harirampur is a major agricultural area with flat and Loamy soil, in some cases muddy Atel soils. Most of the people here are dependent on agriculture.Therefore, rice, wheat, corn, mustard, jute and Varieties vegetable crops are cultivated in this area. Aush paddy and jute are cultivated here as kharif crops and paddy, wheat and maize are cultivated as rabi crops. There are no rivers flowing through this region so farming is generally dependent on water from ponds and reservoirs and rabi crops in most areas depend on ground water.
