= Dhepa River =

River in Bangladesh

Coordinates: 25°38′N 88°39′E

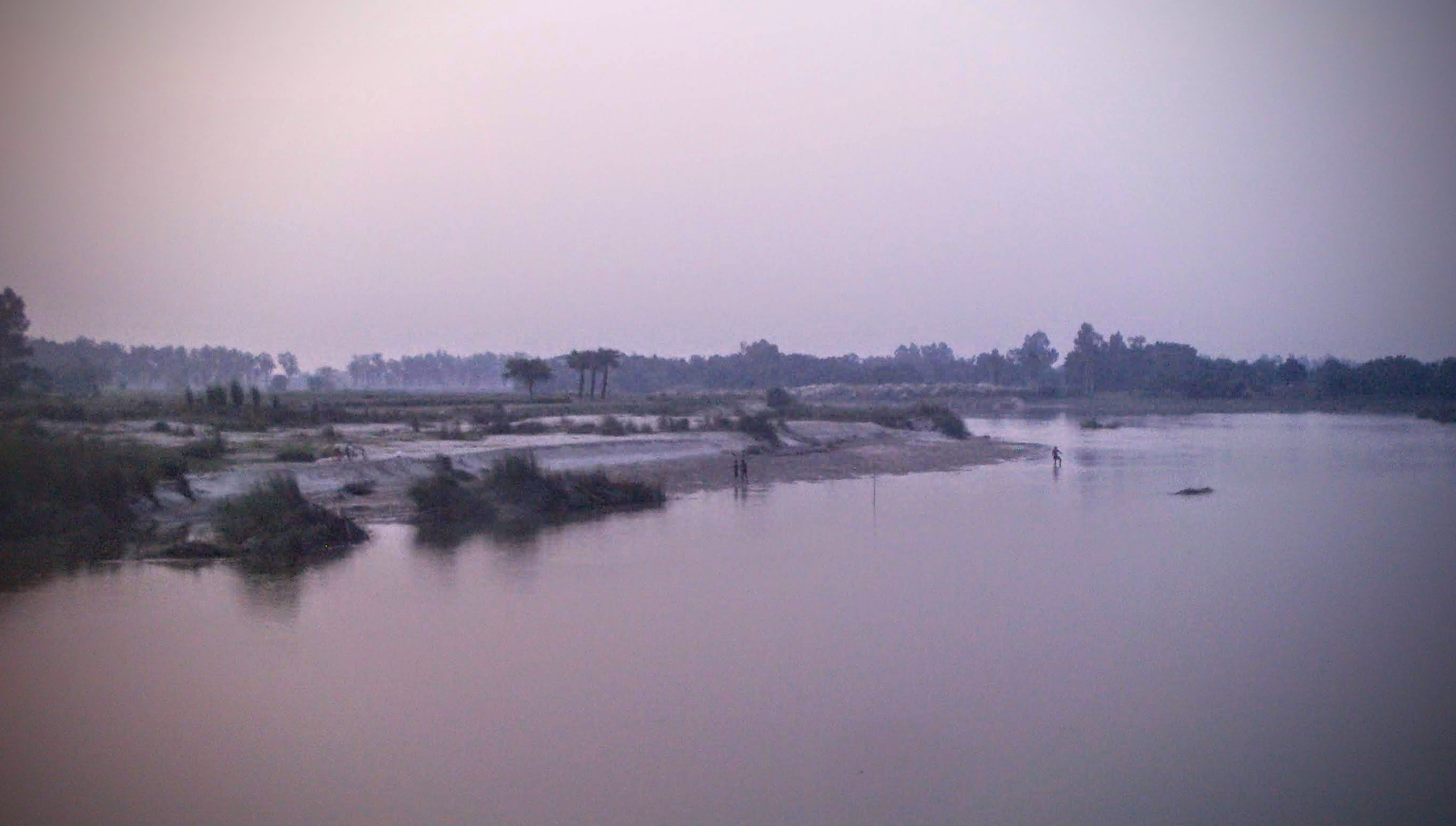
Dhepa River, Dinajpur

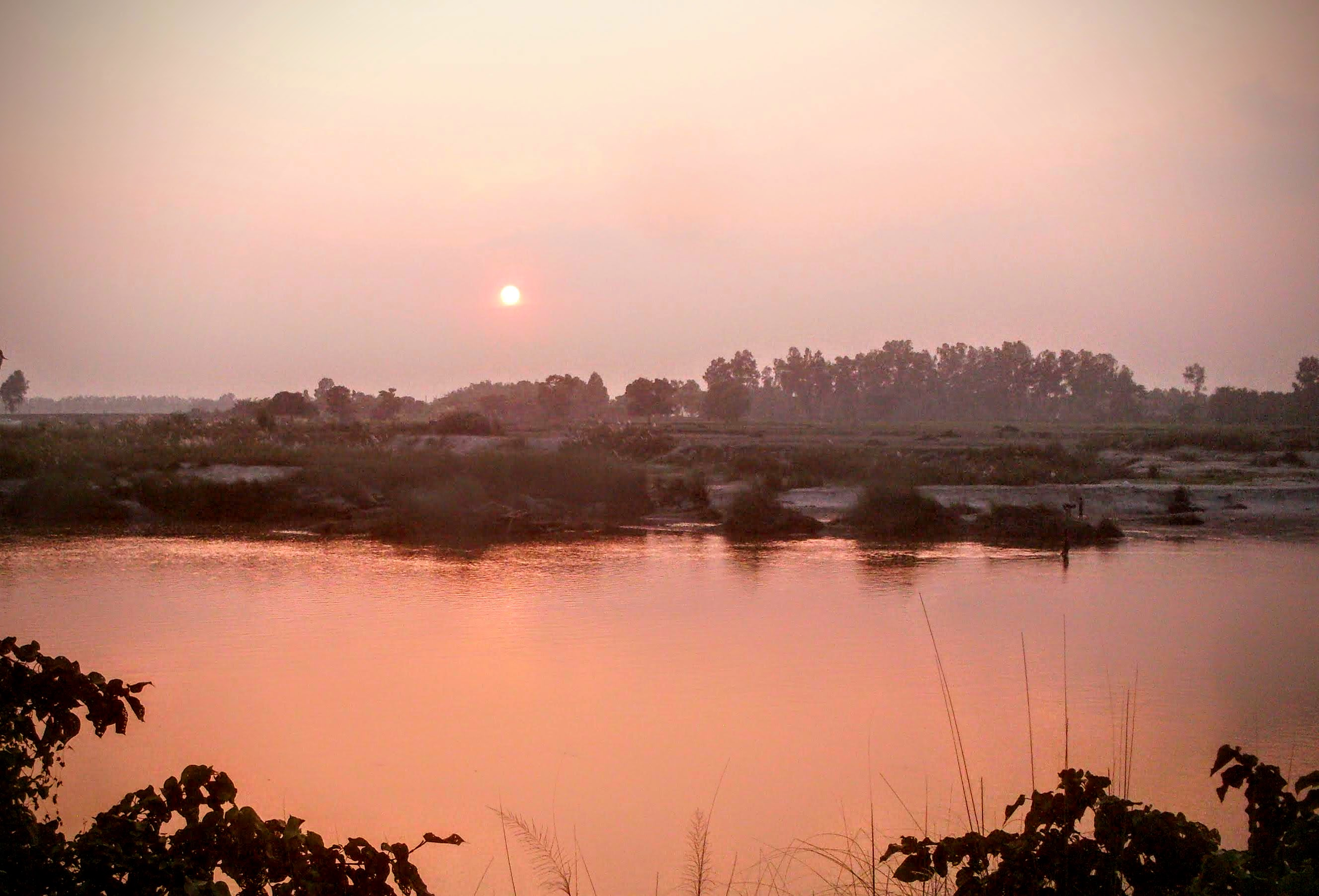
Dhepa River, Dinajpur

The Dhepa is a small river in northern Bangladesh. The river originates from the Atrai River in Mohanpur and joins the Punarbhaba. The length of the river is 40 kilometres (25 mi), and its depth around 6 metres (20 ft). The Dhepa is one of the three main rivers of Dinajpur District, the other two being the Punarbhaba and Atrai rivers.
