= Kushmandi, Dakshin Dinajpur =

Kushmandi
- Village
- Location in West Bengal, India Kushmandi (India)
- Coordinates: 25°31′35″N 88°21′56″E
- Country: India
- State: West Bengal
- District: Dakshin Dinajpur

Population (2011)
  - Total: 3,948

Languages
  - Official: Bengali, English
- Time zone: UTC+5:30 (IST)
- PIN: 733132
- STD/ Telephone code: 03524
- Lok Sabha constituency: Balurghat
- Vidhan Sabha constituency: Kushmandi
- Website: ddinajpur.nic.in

Kushmandi (also referred to as Kushmundi) is a village in Kushmandi CD Block in Gangarampur subdivision of Dakshin Dinajpur district in the state of West Bengal, India.

== Geography ==
Cities and towns in the Dakshin Dinajpur district
M: municipal city/ town, CT: census town, R: rural/ urban centre, H: historical site
Owing to space constraints in the small map, the actual locations in a larger map may vary slightly

=== Location ===
Kushmandi is located at 25.53036°N 88.365269°E

In the map alongside, all places marked on the map are linked in the full screen version.

=== Police station ===
Kushmandi police station under West Bengal police has jurisdiction over Kushmandi CD Block.

=== CD block HQ ===
The headquarters of Kushmandi CD block is at Kushmandi.

== Demographics ==
As per the 2011 Census of India, Kushmundi had a total population of 3,948, of which 1,999 (51%) were males and 1,949 (49%) were females. Population below 6 years was 371. The total number of literates in Kushmundi was 3,104 (86.78% of the population over 6 years).

== Transport ==
State Highway 10A passes through Kushmandi.

New broad gauge line from Kaliaganj to Buniadpur (33.10 km), passing through Kushmandi, was included in the budget 2010–11. 157.938 ha of land to be acquired. As of August 2018, project work by Northeast Frontier Railway held up mainly because of paucity of funds.

== Education ==
Kushmandi Government College was established at Kushmandi in 2015. It is affiliated to Gour Banga University and offers honours courses in Bengali, English, history, philosophy and political science, and general courses in arts and science.

== Healthcare ==
Kushmandi Rural Hospital at Kushmandi (with 30 beds) is the main medical facility in Kushmandi CD Block. There are primary health centres at Sehail (Nanaharpara PHC) (with 10 beds) and Aminpur (with 10 beds).
