= Bangarh =

Ancient city in Dakshin Dinajpur district, West Bengal, India

- Kotivarsha, Devkot Devikota, Devakota, Diw-kot
- Aerial view of Bangarh, Gangarampur
- Location within West Bengal Location within India
- 25°24′45″N 88°31′50″E
- Type: settlement
- Location: Gangarampur, West Bengal, India

History
- Built: Earlier than 200 BC

Bangarh is an archaeological site situated in Gangarampur, West Bengal, India. It represents the ancient and medieval city of Kotivarsha (Koṭivarṣa, or Koṭīvarṣa), also called Devikot, which was an important commercial, religious, and administrative centre.

Based on archaeological finds, Kotivarsha appears to have first become a significant town around the Shunga period. A local tradition of goddess worship appears to have been present by this point, which later becomes attested in literary sources. Kotivarsha was the capital of a vishaya (district) within the province of Pundravardhana during the Gupta period. By approximately the period c. 550–650, Kotivarsha was "a centre of the goddess-oriented Tantric Shaivism". It also appears to have held significance within Vaishnavism and Buddhism, with at least one work of Buddhist tantric literature describing the city as a pilgrimage site.

Kotivarsha continued to hold significance during the period of Islamic rule. It is attested as a district capital as late as the 1590s.

== Names ==
The 12th-century writer Hemachandra wrote that the names Koṭivarṣa, Bāṇapura, Devīkoṭa, Umāvana, and Śoṇitapura all referred to the same place. A similar list was provided by Puruṣottama, except he had Uṣāvana instead of Umāvana. Bāṇapura is the apparent ancestor of the present name Bangarh; the place is supposed to be connected with the mythical king Bāṇa. The fort at Bangarh is also called "Damdamaḥ" in recent times.

== Geography ==
Cities and towns in the Dakshin Dinajpur district
M: municipal city/ town, CT: census town, R: rural/ urban centre, H: historical site
Owing to space constraints in the small map, the actual locations in a larger map may vary slightly

=== Location ===
The site of Bangarh is located on the eastern bank of the Punarbhaba River, about 29 km south of the city of Dinajpur. The main mound is roughly rectangular and about 549 × 457 m in size, with the longer side on a northeast-to-southwest axis, parallel with the course of the river. The alignment with the river was probably intentional, planned when the city was being built. A moat surrounds this rectangular area on the west, south, and east; and all four sides were protected by rampart walls.

In the map alongside, all places marked on the map are linked in the full screen version.

== History ==
Archaeological excavations at Bangarh under Kunja Gobinda Goswami (see below) indicated five strata of brick structures and miscellaneous objects corresponding to different periods of the site's history. Goswami suggested that the earliest layer (Stratum V, the lowest) may correspond to approximately the Maurya or early Shunga periods. Archaeological finds from this layer are scarce, and the only structure encountered is a ring well, leaving it unclear what houses were made of. The settlement was probably surrounded by a mud wall at this point.

=== Shunga period ===
The second layer (Stratum IV) can be dated to approximately the 2nd and 1st centuries BCE, during the Shunga period, due to the presence of various punch-marked silver and copper coins, along with cast copper coins, that were commonly used during this period. A couple of terracotta seals inscribed with early Brahmi script were found in this layer, including one palaeographically dated to approximately the 1st century BCE or 1st century CE that says Chhatagahasa samana vilalasa, meaning "of śramaṇa Vilala, an inhabitant of Chhatragrha", with Chhatragrha being the name of an unidentified place.

During this period, the settlement at Bangarh appears to have become a substantial, relatively prosperous town. It was now surrounded by a burnt-brick wall instead of a mud one, and there were houses, drains, and cess pits, which were all likewise made of burnt bricks.

Also, images of goddesses, either on terracotta plaques or in the form of terracotta sculptures, are "substantial" in number from finds at Bangarh, and they are most common from Stratum IV. This indicates that goddess worship, which is textually attested later on, was significant locally by at least this period.

=== Gupta period ===
The third stratum (Stratum III) at Bangarh corresponds roughly to the Gupta period (c. 3rd through 6th centuries CE). Buildings from this period appear to have been poorly built, and the walls found by Goswami's team were extremely thin, to the point that they seem incapable of supporting a roof. Some roof tiles have been found from this period, as well as a couple of ceramic finials that probably adorned the two front corners of the building at the top. One very large structure from this layer "probably marks the site of a large quadrangle by the side of some temple where people perhaps used to assemble for the purpose of religious, social, or commercial activities".

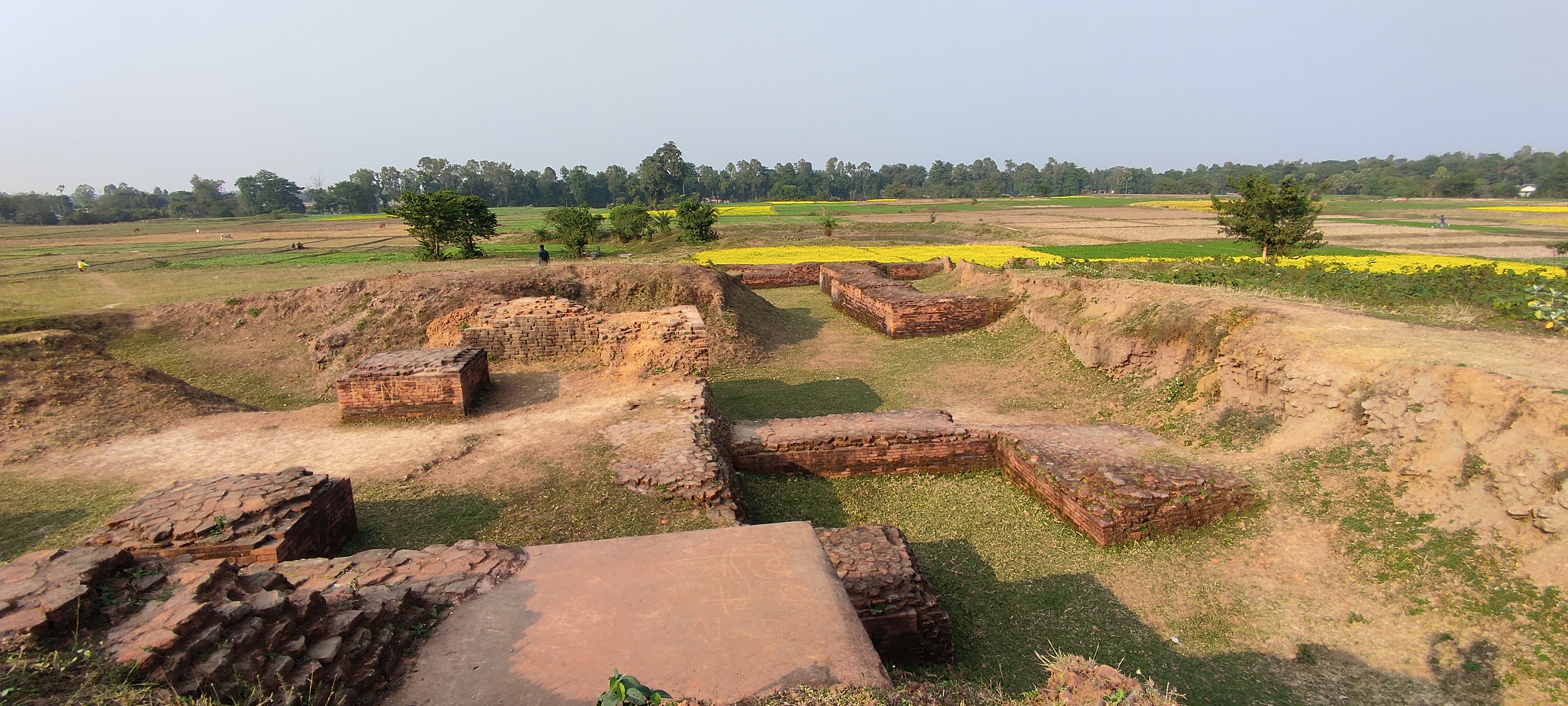
Excavated remains of brick structures at Bangarh

The earliest epigraphic reference to Kotivarsha is a series of copper plate inscriptions from Damodarpur (in what is now Bangladesh), ranging in date from 444 CE to 543 CE (there are also dated inscriptions from 447 and 482 CE, along with one undated inscription), providing information on the local administrative and economic situation at Kotivarsha during the latter part of the Gupta Empire. In these inscriptions, Koṭivarṣa is described as a viṣaya (district) in Pauṇḍra bhukti (province). The city of Kotivarsha itself was governed by a nagaraśreṣṭhin, or mayor, along with a three-member board consisting of "a distinguished merchant (sārthavāha), artisan (kulika), and administrator (kāyastha)". Names of each of these office holders are provided in each of the inscriptions. The price of fallow state land remained constant throughout this period — three gold coins (dīnāras) for one kulyavāpa of land, even in spite of the inflation caused by coin debasement in the later Imperial Gupta period — which indicates that there was significant local stability at Kotivarsha through this period.

Archaeological excavations showed no break in continuity in habitation at Bangarh anywhere between the Shunga and Pala periods, indicating relative stability.

The earliest literary mentions of Kotivarsha are found in the Vayu Purana (XXIII,209) and the Bṛhat Saṃhitā (XI, II).

=== The Koṭīvarṣa-Māhātmya and other religious texts ===
The compilation date of the Skanda Purana is roughly assigned to the period between 550 and 650 CE. The second half of Chapter 171 of the earliest known version of the Skanda Purana is called the Koṭīvarṣa-Māhātmya by Yuko Yokochi, consists of "the foundation myth and description of Kotivarsa". It describes the creation of the Sapta Mātṛkās (seven mother goddesses), along with various other mother goddesses, from their male counterparts in order to defeat a group of demons, led by one named Haimakuṇḍa, that were oppressing the people of Kotivarsha, because the demons could only be killed by women. The group of the Sapta Mātṛkās is presented here in its standard form, except that Cāmuṇḍā is replaced with a goddess named Bahumāṃsā, who is described as being the greatest of the Mātṛkās and as being created from a "deformed" form of Shiva. Shiva, who is described in the text as the cause (hetu) and creator of the Mātṛkās, is given the epithet Hetukeśvara as the husband/leader of the Mātṛkās, and he is said to be present at Kotivarsha as Hetukeśvara along with the Mātṛkās. Since Bahumāṃsā killed the demons with her śūla (which Yokochi interprets to mean "lance" here rather than the trident, or triśūla, as it typically does in later texts), a sacred pond (tīrtha) called Śūlakuṇḍa is described as coming into being at Kotivarsha. A series of tantras, called Yāmalas, associated with the Mātṛkās are described as being composed at Kotivarsha, and it is stated that women who worship the Mātṛkās with esoteric rites will become Yogeśvarīs.

From its description in this text, Yokochi concludes that Kotivarsha "had been a centre of the goddess-oriented Tantric Shaivism at the time of the original redaction of the Skandapurana". Shiva as Hetukeśvara, later identified with Bhairava, was evidently the main deity at Kotivarsha at this point. According to Yokochi, "it is certain that Kotivarsha was regarded as a stronghold of the adherents of the Yāmala scriptures" at this point. The Koṭīvarṣa-Māhātmya is also notable because it is the earliest known textual reference to the Sapta Mātṛkās (although they are depicted in iconography as early as the 5th century).

Yokochi considers Bahumāṃsā, portrayed as the leader of the Mātṛkās in the Koṭīvarṣa-Māhātmya, to be a tutelary goddess of Kotivarsha who was generally similar to Chamunda, with a terrifying aspect. She also considers it likely that Bahumāṃsā is related to Lohitāyani, a goddess mentioned in the Mahābhārata, and to Koṭavī, a goddess mentioned in the Harivaṃśa in connection with an episode taking place at Śoṇitapura (which is identified in later texts as synonymous with Kotivarsha). (Note: Yokochi cautions that the Śoṇitapura mentioned in the Harivaṃśa may have originally been purely a mythological location that was later "reified and identified with Koṭīvarṣa"; however, based on some narrative similarities, she considers it plausible that the Śoṇitapura of the Harivaṃśa was meant to refer to Kotivarsha.) Based on this, Yokochi suggests that Kotivarsha was originally mainly associated with this local or regional goddess who was known by various names, who "was terrifying and at the same time motherly", and who was described as the daughter of the Brahmaputra. By the 6th or 7th century, this goddess had been "integrated into Śaivism as a Cāmuṇḍā-type goddess", with Shiva Hetukeśvara becoming the city's main tutelary deity while the goddess remained crucially important.

A later recension of the Skanda Purana, dated to sometime between c. 800-1100 CE, contains a different version of the Koṭīvarṣa-Māhātmya. This version places more emphasis on Shiva as Bhairava-Hetukeśvara, and there is no mention of Bahumāṃsā, although Cāmuṇḍā is mentioned in passing.

Of the Yāmala scriptures mentioned in the Koṭīvarṣa-Māhātmya, at least one, the Brahmayāmala, is still extant. The earliest known manuscript of the Brahmayāmala is a Nepalese palm-leaf manuscript dated to 1052. This manuscript contains a passage describing how to draw the Koṭivarṣa Maṇḍala, as part of a larger "Mahāmaṇḍala". This passage is likely one of the earlier parts of the Brahmayāmala and may date from around the same time as the earlier version of the Koṭīvarṣa-Māhātmya. The Koṭivarṣa Maṇḍala depicts Koṭivarṣa as one of eight directional cremation grounds (specifically, it is the one at the upper right), and at its centre is a lotus-shaped sub-maṇḍala depicting Shiva as Hetukeśvara in the middle. Hetukeśvara is explicitly equated with Bhairava here, and he is supposed to be drawn surrounded by six yoginis (none of whom are equivalent to any of the Mātṛkās). There does not appear to be any direct depiction of the goddess Bahumāṃsā in this maṇḍala; however, it depicts both a śūla and a pond called Śūlodaka, which may both be indirect references to Bahumāṃsā, thus reflecting the local religious traditions.

Another religious text depicting Kotivarsha is the Niśisaṃcāra, which is of an uncertain date, although it appears to be somewhat later than the Brahmayāmala. An undated Nepalese manuscript of the Niśisaṃcāra, paleographically assigned to perhaps c. the 12th century, refers to a pair of guardian deities of Kotivarsha: Karṇamoṭī, who is described as "the mistress of all the Yogeśvarīs", and who is described as wielding a lance (śūla) and living in a banyan tree; and Hetuka, who is described as having "a monstrous body". Karṇamoṭī is probably another epithet of the goddess called Bahumāṃsā, and she is given a higher importance here (where she is paired with Hetuka) than in the Brahmayāmala.

At least one Buddhist text also describes Kotivarsha (as Devīkoṭa) as a pilgrimage place and describes its foundation myth: the Caturaśītisiddhapravrtti of Abhayadattaśrī, which is a work in the Tantric Buddhist tradition.

=== Pala period ===
The fourth period at Bangarh (Stratum II) was assigned by Goswami to the Pala period. This appears to have been a prosperous period for the city, and the construction quality of the various structures found from this period is high. These include various houses, a granary, a rampart wall with at least one bastion, a pillared hall with a lotus-shaped kunda inside it, and what appears to be a temple with an ambulatory path around it.

Two inscriptions from around the time of Nayapala in the mid-11th century indicate that Kotivarsha was the site of royal patronage during this period. One, found at a place called Syan, describes the construction of a large stone temple of Hetukeśvara Śambhu at Devīkoṭa (i.e., Kotivarsha). The other, found at Shibbari, near Bangarh itself, contains the eulogy of a Saiddhāntika acharya named Mūrtiśiva, describes the construction of a statue of him, and also has two stanzas dedicated to the goddess Carcikā. This inscription is significant because it indicates that the Saiddhāntikas had become established in Kotivarsha by this time. A statue of Mūrtiśiva found at Shibbari is probably the same statue mentioned in the inscription. As for the goddess Carcikā, the description of "her emaciated body due to her suffering unquenchable hunger and thirst" indicates that she was also similar to Chamunda and thus identical with the earlier tutelary goddess called Bahumāṃsā (among her other names).

Numerous religious images have been found from Shibbari, all dated to the Pala period. They come from several religious traditions — in addition to Shaivism, there are some from Vaishnavism as well as Buddhism. This indicates that Kotivarsha was a religious centre for several religious groups during the 11th and 12th centuries.

Lexicographers Hemchandra (the Abhidhanachintamani IV,977) and Purushottama (in his Trikandashesha) have mentioned the city by several names – Uma(Usha?)vana, Banapura. Sandhyakara Nandi, in his Ramacharita, described at length the temples and the lakes of the city. The ruins of the city are found in Bangarh, which is located at Gangarampur city, about 45 km south of Balurghat city, in Dakshin Dinajpur district of West Bengal state in eastern India. There was a Buddhist monastery at Devikota.

=== Muslim period ===
Muslim rule was first established in Bengal in 1204 by Muhammad Bakhtiyar Khalji. The kingdom was called Lakhnawati or Lakhnauti. The capital was located sometimes at Lakhnawati and sometimes at Devkot. Bakhtiyar Khalji died at Devkot in 1205–06, possibly murdered by Ali Mardan Khalji, who was governor of Naran-Koh.

The uppermost archaeological layer at Bangarh (Stratum I) corresponds to the Muslim period. Structures from this period appear to have been poorly built, heavily reusing earlier materials and often built on top of older structures. On top of that, they have been poorly preserved due to subsequent human activity such as agriculture.

Debīkoṭ was listed in the Ain-i-Akbari as a mahal in sarkar Lakhnauti (the name is spelled "Dihikoṭ" or "Dehīkoṭ" in extant copies of the Ain). The mahal of Debīkoṭ was listed with an assessed revenue of 31,624 dams. It was also the seat of a juwār (subdivision between a sarkar and a mahal) including 6 other mahals, although none of the others have been located.

== Excavations at Bangarh ==
The earliest excavations at Bangarh were carried out by a team led by K.G. Goswami during 1938–41. Located on the bank of the Punarbhaba, the excavated site reflects its urban character. The site has its core in the form of a citadel surrounded by mud ramparts (area about 25 hectares), which dates from the earliest phase of the site. The citadel area revealed five cultural phases dating from the time of the Mauryas to the medieval period. The initial phase (the Mauryan period) indicates that the city had a modest beginning in which it probably had a mud rampart wall. It was only in the following phase (the Kushana period, 200 BCE - 300 CE) that a brick built wide rampart wall was found with drains, cesspits and residential buildings made of burnt bricks of a very large size, showing distinct signs of prosperity and burgeoning urbanism. The excavated materials of the Gupta period are not comparable with the richness and diversity of those belonging to the Kushana cultural phase. Though the late Gupta phase of Bangarh is marked by decadence, particularly in terms of building activities, the Pala period (mid 8th century -12th century), in sharp contrast, indicates a picture of efflorescence. Rampart walls, compound walls, residential quarters, temples with ambulatory path and its enclosing walls, damp proof granaries, bathrooms, drains and ring wells suggest a prosperous condition of the city.

A second excavation was undertaken by the Archaeological Survey of India beginning in 2011.

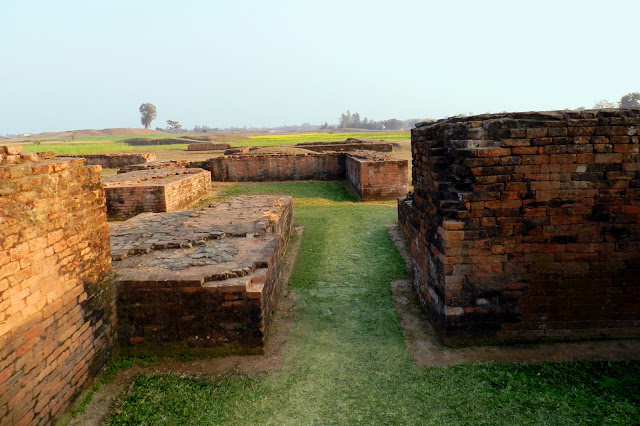
Ruins of the palace at Bangarh
