= Kalikamora =

Village in West Bengal

- Village
- Location within West Bengal Location within India
- Coordinates: 25°27′46.01″N 88°24′20.33″E
- Country: India
- State: West Bengal
- District: Dakshin Dinajpur

Area
  - Total: 0.663 km^{2} (0.256 sq mi)

Population (2011)
  - Total: 681
  - Male: 365
  - Female: 316

Muslims = 100% ▲ Hindus = 0% Others (Christian, Sikh, Buddhists) = 0%

Languages
  - Official: Bengali, English
- Time zone: UTC+5:30 (IST)
- PIN: 733121
- Telephone Code: 03524
- Vehicle registration: WB
- Climate: Moderate, Comfortable (Köppen)
- Lok Sabha constituency: Balurghat
- Nearest city: Buniadpur
- Website: ddinajpur.nic.in

Kalikamora is a small village located in Kushmandi subdivision of Dakshin Dinajpur district in West Bengal, India.

== Location ==
It is situated 8.2 km (5.1 mi) from sub-district headquarters Buniadpur. Balurghat is the district headquarters of this village. Kalikamora gram panchayat is the gram panchayat of this village. The total geographical area of the village is 66.3 hectares (164 acres; 0.663 km^{2}). The village code of this village is 310471.

== Population ==
With about 159 houses, this village has a total population of 681 people amongst them are 365 male and 316 female and a total geographical area of 66.3 hectares (164 acres) or 0.663 km^{2}.

== See also ==
- Amlahar village in Dakshin Dinajpur.
- Joredighi town in Dakshin Dinajpur.
