= Kushmandi =

- Community development block
- Coordinates: 25°31′35″N 88°21′56″E
- Country: India
- State: West Bengal
- District: Dakshin Dinajpur

Government
  - Type: Community development block

Area
  - Total: 310.50 km^{2} (119.88 sq mi)

Population (2011)
  - Total: 198,752
  - Density: 640.10/km^{2} (1,657.9/sq mi)

Languages
  - Official: Bengali, English
- Time zone: UTC+5:30 (IST)
- Lok Sabha constituency: Balurghat
- Vidhan Sabha constituency: Kushmandi
- Website: ddinajpur.nic.in

Kushmandi is a community development block that forms an administrative division in Gangarampur subdivision of Dakshin Dinajpur district in the Indian state of West Bengal.

== History ==
Dinajpur district was constituted in 1786. In 1947, the Radcliffe Line placed the Sadar and Thakurgaon subdivisions of Dinajpur district in East Pakistan. The Balurghat subdivision of Dinajpur district was reconstituted as West Dinajpur district in West Bengal. The new Raiganj subdivision was formed in 1948. In order to restore territorial links between northern and southern parts of West Bengal which had been snapped during the partition of Bengal, and on the recommendations of the States Reorganisation Commission a portion of the erstwhile Kishanganj subdivision comprising Goalpokhar, Islampur and Chopra thanas (police stations) and parts of Thakurganj thana, along with the adjacent parts of the erstwhile Gopalpur thana in Katihar subdivision were transferred from Purnea district in Bihar to West Bengal in 1956, and were formally incorporated into Raiganj subdivision in West Dinajpur. The township of Kishanganj and its entire municipal boundary remained within Bihar. With the introduction of the Community Development Programme in 1960-61, community development blocks were set up in West Dinajpur district. In 1992, West Dinajpur district was bifurcated and Dakshin Dinajpur district was established.

== Geography ==
Kushmandi is located at 25.52236°N 88.357269°E.

Dakshin Dinajpur district is physiographically a part of the Barind Tract. The area is generally flat and slightly undulating. The elevation of the district is about 15 metres above mean sea level. However, the soil varies. CD Blocks such as Balurghat, Hili and Kumarganj have alluvial soil, Tapan CD Block has laterite soil. There are three main rivers. The Atreyee comes from Bangladesh, flows through Kumarganj and Balurghat CD Blocks and goes back to Bangladesh. The Punarbhaba flows through Gangarampur and Tapan CD Blocks. The Tangon flows through Kushmandi and Bansihari CD Blocks. There is a small river named Jamuna in the Hili CD Block. All rivers, flowing from north to south, overflow during the monsoons and cause floods.

Kushmandi is bounded by Kaliaganj CD Block, in Uttar Dinajpur district and Biral Upazila in Dinajpur District, Bangladesh, on the north, Gangarampur CD Block on the east, Bansihari and Harirampur CD Blocks on the south and Kaliaganj CD Block in Uttar Dinajpur district on the west.

Six out of the eight CD Blocks in the district are on the India-Bangladesh border popularly referred to as a porous border. 2,216 km of the 4,096 km long India-Bangladesh border falls in West Bengal. More than 11,000 people live near/ around the zero line in Dakshin Dinajpur. Approximately 252 km of the international border is in Dakshin Dinajpur district.

Kushmandi CD Block has an area of 310.63 km^{2}.It has 1 panchayat samity, 8 gram panchayats, 133 gram sansads (village councils), 231 mouzas and 228 inhabited villages. Kushmandi police station serves this block. Headquarters of this CD Block is at Kushmandi.

Gram panchayats of Kushmandi block/ panchayat samiti are: Akcha, Berail, Deul, Kalikamora, Karanji, Kushmandi, Maligaon and Udaypur.

=== Tourist spots ===
==== Ayra forest ====
A forest situated near the India-Bangladesh border, has many ponds and old trees. It is a place where many people come for picnics in winter. On Christmas day and New Year day, the place becomes crowded by the travelers for enjoying nature's beauty of the place and Mahipal dighi.

==== Mahipal Dighi ====
Mahipal dighi, a large lake, is located in Kushmandi block. It has a length of 4 km approx and a diameter 0.6 km. It was dug by King Mahipal II of the Pal dynasty. There are debris of an Indigo kuthi on the northern bank of the Lack which was established by Mr. Thomas, an indigo merchant, a friend of William Carey.

==== Temple of Lord Shiva ====
An ancient temple situated at Aminpur. This is "Panchamukhi" (Five headed) Shiva temple, which is very rare in India. This temple is constructed by Zamindar of Aminpur. Famous Maatia Maa Kali temple is also situation nearby.

== Demographics ==
=== Population ===
As per 2011 Census of India, Kushmandi CD Block had a total population of 198,752, all of which were rural. There were 100,317 (50%) males and 98,435 (50%) females. Population below 6 years was 25,687. Scheduled Castes numbered 88,967 (44.76%) and Scheduled Tribes numbered 15,622 (7.86%).

As per 2001 census Kushmandi block had a population of 175,086 of which 89,130 are males and 85,956 are females.

The only large village (with 4,000+ population) in Kushmandi CD Block was (2011 population in brackets): Nahit (4,630).

Other villages in Kushmandi CD Block included (2011 population in brackets): Maligaon (1,472), Udaypur (2,378), Akcha (711), Berail (2,459), Deul (1,781), Kushmundi (3,948), Karangi (3,772) and Kalikamora (689).

Decadal growth of population in Kushmandi CD Block for the period 2001-2011 was 13.52%. Decadal growth of population in Dakhin Dinajpur district during the same period was 11.52% down from 22.15% in the previous decade. Decadal growth of population in West Bengal for the corresponding periods was 13.93% and 17.77% respectively.

The large scale migration of the East Bengali refugees (including tribals) started with the partition of Bengal in 1947. Up to around 1951, two-fifths of the refugees settled in South Bengal, the balance settled in the North Bengal districts of West Dinajpur, Jalpaiguri and Cooch Behar. Erstwhile West Dinajpur alone received around 6.5% of the early entrants. The steady flow of people into Dakshin Dinajpur has continued over the years from erstwhile East Pakistan and subsequently from Bangladesh.

=== Literacy ===
As per the 2011 census, the total number of literates in Kushmandi CD Block was 113,240 (65.43% of the population over 6 years) out of which males numbered 62,611 (71.82% of the male population over 6 years) and females numbered 50,629 (58.96% of the female population over 6 years). The gender disparity (the difference between female and male literacy rates) was 12.86%.

See also – List of West Bengal districts ranked by literacy rate

Literacy in CD blocks of
Dakshin Dinajpur district
Balurghat subdivision
Balurghat – 73.96%
Hili – 76.04%
Kumarganj – 74.57%
Tapan – 68.62%
Gangrampur subdivision
Bansihari – 68.79%
Gangarampur – 71.45%
Harirampur – 64.67%
Kushmandi – 65.43%
Source: 2011 Census: CD Block Wise
Primary Census Abstract Data

=== Language and religion ===
Religion in Kushmandi CD block (2011)
Hinduism	60.32%
Islam	38.86%
Christianity	0.68%
Other or not stated	0.14%

As per 2014 District Statistical Handbook: Dakshin Dinajpur (quoting census figures), in the 2001 census, in Kushmandi CD Block, Hindus numbered 105,711 and formed 60.38% of the population. Muslims numbered 67,819 and formed 38.73% of the population. Christians numbered 1,049 and formed 0.60% of the population. Others numbered 507 and formed 0.39% of the population. In the 2011 census, 119,891 (60.32%) were Hindus and 77,239 (38.86%) Muslims, while 890 were Christian.

According to the 2011 District Census Handbook: Dakshin Dinajpur, during 2011 census, majority of the population of the district were Hindus constituting 73.5% of the population followed by Muslims with 24.6% of the population. The proportion of Hindu population of the district increased from 59.9% in 1961 to 74.0 %in 2001 and then dropped to 73.5% in 2011. The proportion of Muslim population in the district decreased from 39.4% in 1961 to 24.0% in 2001 and then increased to 24.6% in 2011.

Languages of Kushmandi CD block (2011)
1. Bengali (93.3%)
2. Santali (5.24%)
3. Rajbongshi (1.02%)
4. Others (0.42%)

At the time of the 2011 census, 93.32% of the population spoke Bengali, 5.24% Santali and 1.64% Rajbongshi as their first language.

== Rural poverty ==
As per the Human Development Report 2004 for West Bengal, the rural poverty ratio in erstwhile West Dinajpur district was 27.61%. Malda district on the south of West Dinajpur district had a rural poverty ratio of 35.4% and Jalpaiguri district on the north had a rural poverty ratio of 35.73%. These estimates were based on Central Sample data of NSS 55th round 1999-2000.

As per BPL Survey by the Government of West Bengal, the proportion of BPL families in Dakshin Dinajpur district was 43.54% as on 30 October 2002.

== Economy ==
=== Livelihood ===
Livelihood
in Kushmandi CD Block
1. Cultivators (42.5%)
2. Agricultural labourers (45.2%)
3. Household industries (1.33%)
4. Other Workers (11.0%)

In Kushmandi CD Block in 2011, amongst the class of total workers, cultivators numbered 32,188 and formed 42.49%, agricultural labourers numbered 34,251 and formed 45.22%, household industry workers numbered 1,004 and formed 1.33% and other workers numbered 8,305 and formed 10.96%. Total workers numbered 75,748 and formed 38.11% of the total population, and non-workers numbered 123,004 and formed 61.89% of the population.

Note: In the census records a person is considered a cultivator, if the person is engaged in cultivation/ supervision of land owned by self/government/institution. When a person who works on another person's land for wages in cash or kind or share, is regarded as an agricultural labourer. Household industry is defined as an industry conducted by one or more members of the family within the household or village, and one that does not qualify for registration as a factory under the Factories Act. Other workers are persons engaged in some economic activity other than cultivators, agricultural labourers and household workers. It includes factory, mining, plantation, transport and office workers, those engaged in business and commerce, teachers, entertainment artistes and so on.

=== Infrastructure ===
There are 228 inhabited villages in Kushmandi CD Block. All 228 villages (100%) have power supply. 227 villages (99.56%) have drinking water supply. 16 villages (7.02%) have post offices. 217 villages (95.18%) have telephones (including landlines, public call offices and mobile phones). 75 villages (32.89%) have a pucca (paved) approach road and 50 villages (25.93%) have transport communication (includes bus service, rail facility and navigable waterways). 8 villages (3.51%) have agricultural credit societies. 4 villages (1.75%) have banks.

=== Agriculture ===
The land is fertile for agricultural production, particularly in the southern part of the district. The rivers are flood-prone but droughts also occur occasionally. There are numerous tanks and some marshes and bils. Multiple cropping is widely practised. The Tebhaga movement by the share croppers, towards the end of British rule, is widely known. There are some forests, mostly in areas bordering Bangladesh.

Kushmandi CD Block had 192 fertiliser depots, 14 seed stores and 39 fair price shops in 2013-14.

In 2013-14, Kushmandi CD Block produced 129,177 tonnes of Aman paddy, the main winter crop from 42,367 hectares, 8,630 tonnes of Boro paddy (spring crop) from 2,725 hectares, 218 tonnes of Aus paddy (summer crop) from 117 hectares, 7,502 tonnes of wheat from 2,412 hectares, 68,732 tonnes of jute from 4,793 hectares and 31,194 tonnes of potatoes from 1,118 hectares. It also produced pulses and oilseeds.

In 2013-14, the total area irrigated in Kushmandi CD Block was 6,738 hectares, out of which 1,278 hectares were irrigated by tank irrigation, 1,633 hectares by river lift irrigation, 859 hectares by deep tube wells and 2,968 hectares by shallow tube wells.

=== Banking ===
In 2013-14, Kushmandi CD Block had offices of 3 commercial banks and 4 gramin banks.

=== Backward Regions Grant Fund ===
Dakshin Dinajpur district is listed as a backward region and receives financial support from the Backward Regions Grant Fund. The fund, created by the Government of India, is designed to redress regional imbalances in development. As of 2012, 272 districts across the country were listed under this scheme. The list includes 11 districts of West Bengal.

== Transport ==
Kushmandi CD Block has 4 ferry services and 6 originating/ terminating bus routes. The nearest railway station is 15 km from the CD Block headquarters.

State Highway 10A passes through Kushmandi.

== Education ==
In 2013-14, Kushmandi CD Block had 141 primary schools with 14,916 students, 14 middle schools with 1,401 students, 10 high schools with 23,224 students and 11 higher secondary schools with 14,041 students. Kushmandi CD Block had 321 institutions for special and non-formal education with 10,808 students.

In Kushmandi CD Block, amongst the 228 inhabited villages, 58 villages do not have a school, 28 villages have more than 1 primary school, 31 villages have at least 1 primary and 1 middle school and 22 villages have at least 1 middle and 1 secondary school.

Kushmandi Government College was established at Kushmandi in 2015.

== Culture ==
=== Mask of Bengal-Mahishbathan ===
Mahishbathan in South Dinajpur's Kushmandi block is famous for masks (Made by Gamari Wood) based on popular folk and mythological characters like Moshan, Narorakshas, Hanuman, Chamkali, Chamunda etc., with bamboo vases, trays, incense stands, pen stands also being manufactured by the artisans here.

Mask-making began not too long ago, when artisans across the region practiced this art form; from 1990 attempts were made to unify them under the wings of the Mahishbathan Gramin Hostoshilpo Samiti, and scholars from different parts of the world come here to observe the age-old intricate process of bamboo-carving. Bamboo pieces are kept submerged in large reservoirs containing water mixed with mulberry gum powder, bleaching powder and sal; the pieces are taken out after a week and sun-dried. The price of a mask depends on the type of wood it is carved from - with timber varieties such as Gamari, Sal, Mango, Pakur, and Mahogany mainly being used. The wooden masks are meant for use in Gambheera dances or Palas (musical folk theaters), as the carvers, or the performers, treat each mask philosophically, by considering it as the Mukha (face), rather than a Mukhosh (mask) – the belief being that it comes alive as soon as one puts his face behind it. These ornate wooden masks adorn a large number of homes in Bengal and beyond, with a large number of these masks being exported to the USA, and even enjoying pride of place at the annual State Handicrafts Fair.

== Healthcare ==
In 2014, Kushmandi CD Block had 1 rural hospital and 2 primary health centres with total 40 beds and 8 doctors (excluding private bodies). It had 30 family welfare subcentres. 5,376 patients were treated indoor and 147,826 patients were treated outdoor in the hospitals, health centres and subcentres of the CD Block.

Kushmandi Rural Hospital at Kushmandi (with 30 beds) is the main medical facility in Kushmandi CD Block. There are primary health centres at Sehail (Nanaharpara PHC) (with 10 beds) and Aminpur (with 10 beds).

== Media ==
The first web media of Kushmandi, Pratidin 24 Ghanta (Bengali: প্রতিদিন ২৪ ঘন্টা), is a Bengali-language newspaper published from West Bengal, India 2019.
