= Tangon River =

Coordinates: 28°17′N 95°42′E

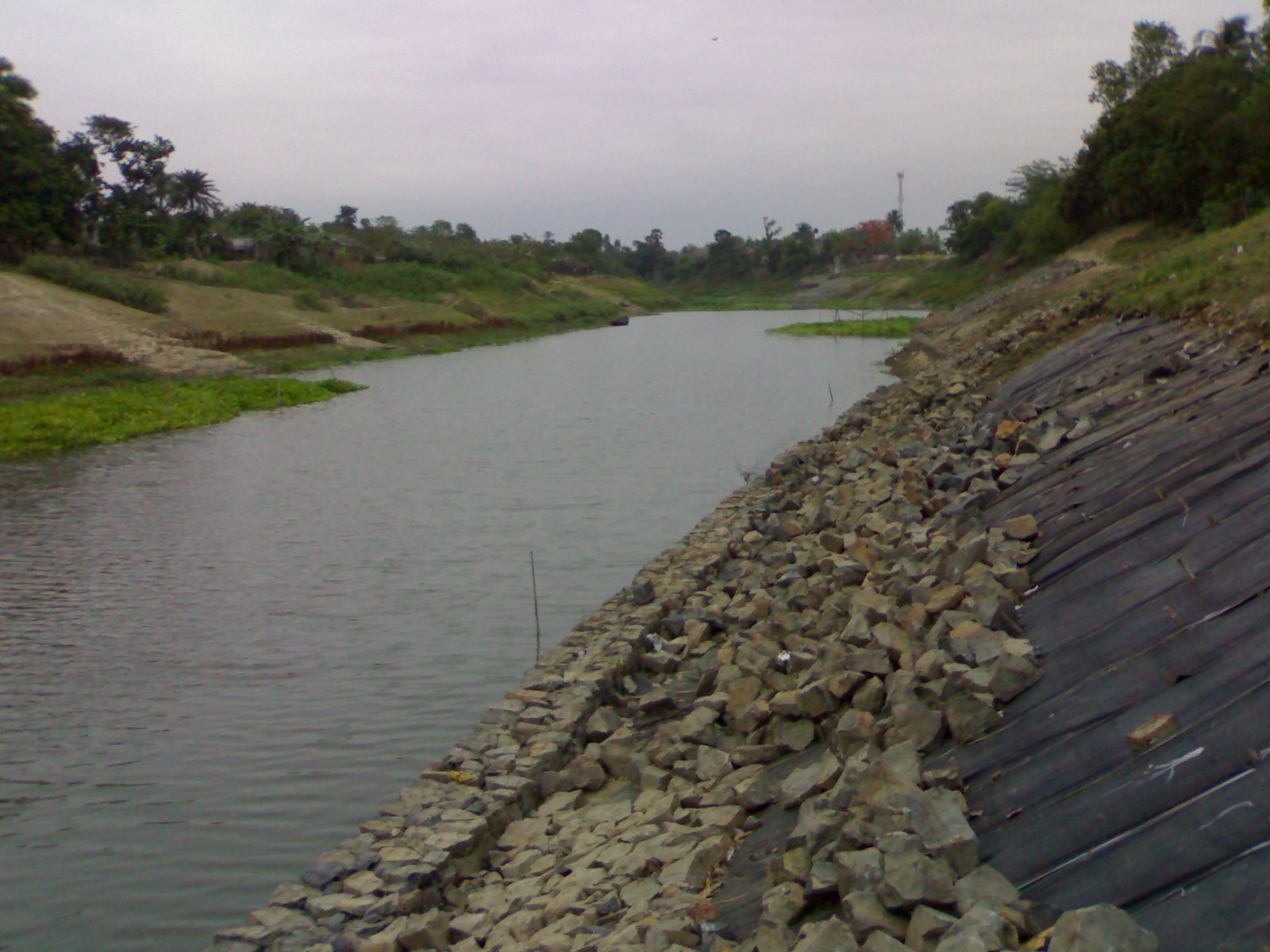
- Tangon at Aiho

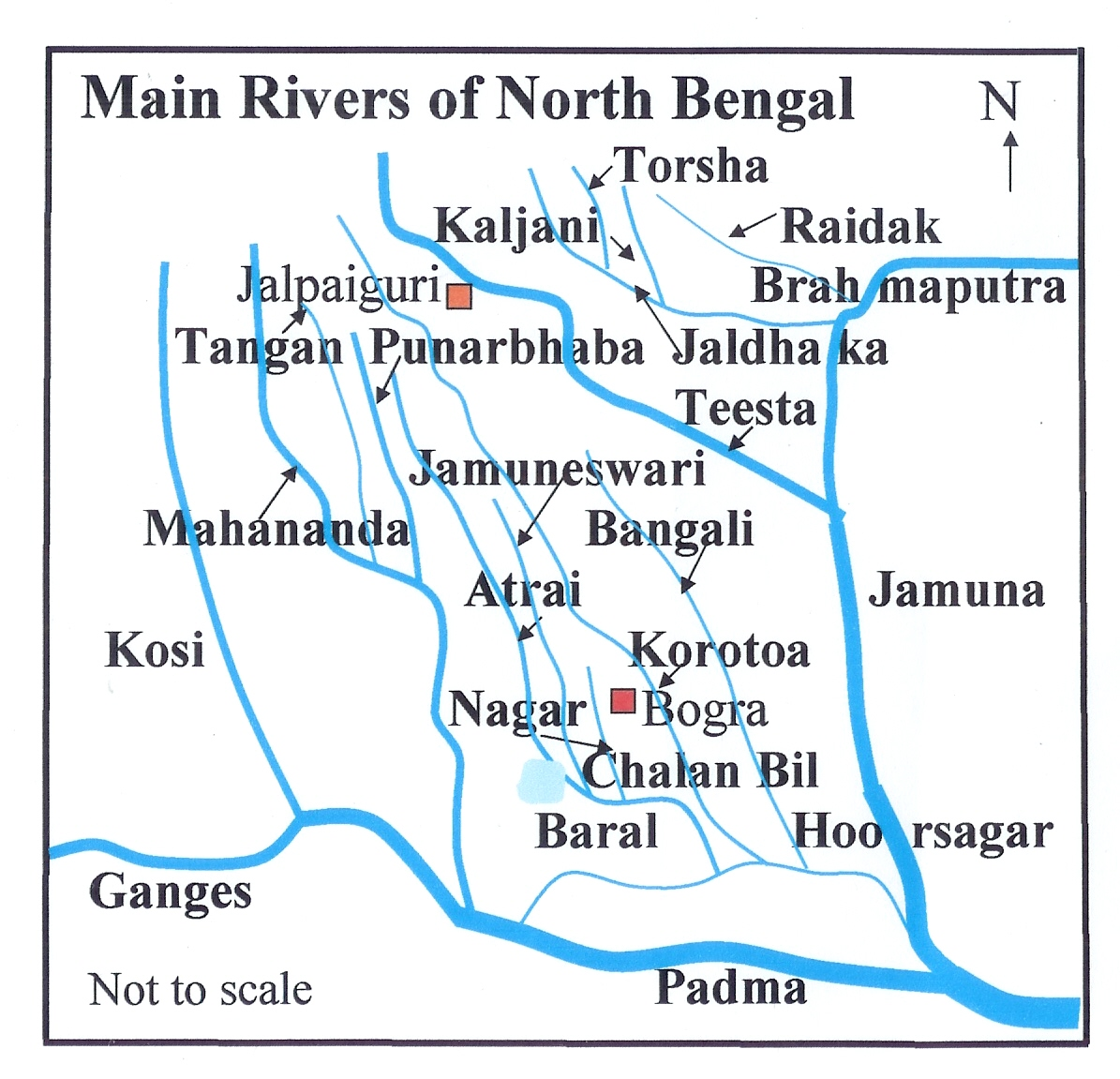

Location
- Country: Bangladesh, India
- State/Division: Rangpur, West Bengal

Physical characteristics
- Discharge
  - location: Punarbhaba River

Tangon River (also known as Tongon River) (Bengali: টাংগন নদী) is a river passing through the Indian state of West Bengal and Bangladesh. It is a tributary of Punarbhaba River. It was named after Tankonath, zamindar of Ranisankail in Thakurgaon District.

After originating in West Bengal, it passes through Panchagarh District, Sadar Upazilla in Thakurgaon District, Pirganj in Thakurgaon District, Bochaganj and Biral in Dinajpur District in Bangladesh before it flows through Kushmandi and Bansihari community development blocks of Dakshin Dinajpur district in West Bengal. There is also a dam constructed on tangan river near boda town, 26'11'32"N 88'28'02" E.

It re-enters Bangladesh and meets Punarbhava River near Rohanpur in Naogaon District.

== Barrage ==
In 1989, a barrage was built across the river 10 kilometres (6 mi) west of Boda in Panchagarh District.
