= Harirampur Assembly constituency =

Assembly constituency in West Bengal, India

Harirampur
- Constituency No. 42 for the West Bengal Legislative Assembly
- Interactive Map Outlining Harirampur Assembly Constituency

Constituency details
- Country: India
- Region: East India
- State: West Bengal
- District: Dakshin Dinajpur
- Lok Sabha constituency: Balurghat
- Established: 2011
- Total electors: 228,189
- Reservation: None

Member of Legislative Assembly
- 18th West Bengal Legislative Assembly
- Incumbent Biplab Mitra
- Party: Democratic Trinamool Congress
- Elected year: 2026

Harirampur Assembly constituency is an assembly constituency in Dakshin Dinajpur district in the Indian state of West Bengal.

== Overview ==
As per orders of the Delimitation Commission, No. 42 Harirampur Assembly constituency covers Buniadpur Municipality, Harirampur community development block, and Bansihari community development block.

Harirampur Assembly constituency is part of No. 6 Balurghat (Lok Sabha constituency).

== Members of the Legislative Assembly ==
Year	Name	Party
2011	Biplab Mitra	All India Trinamool Congress
2016	Rafikul Islam	Communist Party of India (Marxist)
2021	Biplab Mitra	All India Trinamool Congress
2026	Biplab Mitra	All India Trinamool Congress

== Election results ==
=== 2026 ===
2026 West Bengal Legislative Assembly election: Harirampur
Party	Candidate	Votes	%	±%
AITC	Biplab Mitra	93,098	45.62	−5.61
BJP	Debabrata Majumder	91,112	44.65	+5.5
INC	Subhasish Pal	8,462	4.15	
CPI(M)	Gautam Goswami	6,254	3.06	−3.57
NOTA	None of the above	1,013	0.5	−0.47
Majority		1,986	0.97	−11.11
Turnout		204,074	96.49	+14.26
AITC hold		Swing		

=== 2021 ===
West Bengal assembly elections, 2021: Harirampur constituency
Party	Candidate	Votes	%	±%
AITC	Biplab Mitra	96,131	51.23	
BJP	Nilanjan Roy	73,459	39.15	
CPI(M)	Rafikul Islam	12,444	6.63	
Independent	Bijan Chakraborty	1,831	0.98	
NOTA	None of the above	1,823	0.97	
Majority		22,672	12.08	
Turnout		187,642	82.23	
AITC gain from CPI(M)		Swing		

=== 2016 ===
In the 2016 election, Raikul Islam of CPI (M) defeated his nearest rival Biplab Mitra of Trinamool Congress

West Bengal assembly elections, 2016: Harirampur constituency
Party	Candidate	Votes	%	±%
CPI(M)	Rafikul Islam	71,447	42.83	+0.54
AITC	Biplab Mitra	66,943	40.13	−6.31
BJP	Phani Bhusan Mahata	19,845	11.90	+6.77
Kamtapur People's Party (United)	Tarun Sarkar	2,020	1.21	
JDP	Bibhuti Tudu	1,904	1.14	
JMM	Anarul Haque Ansari	1,673	1.00	
NOTA	None of the above	1,648	0.99	
BSP	Durga Hembram	1,336	0.80	−0.57
Turnout		166,816	84.89	+0.28
CPI(M) gain from AITC		Swing		

=== 2011 ===
In the 2011 election, Biplab Mitra of Trinamool Congress defeated his nearest rival Narayan Biswas of CPI(M).

West Bengal assembly elections, 2011: Harirampur constituency
Party	Candidate	Votes	%	±%
AITC	Biplab Mitra	65,099	47.44	
CPI(M)	Narayan Biswas	58,032	42.29	
BJP	Phani Bhusan Mahata	7,039	5.13	
BSP	Kamal Hemram	1,877	1.37	
Independent	Sahajahan Badshah	1,660		
Independent	Bratasubhra Saha	1,364		
Independent	Santosh Sarkar	1,078		
Independent	Sanu Soren	1,070		
Turnout		137,219	84.61	
AITC win (new seat)				
