= Punarbhaba River =

River in West Bengal and Bangladesh

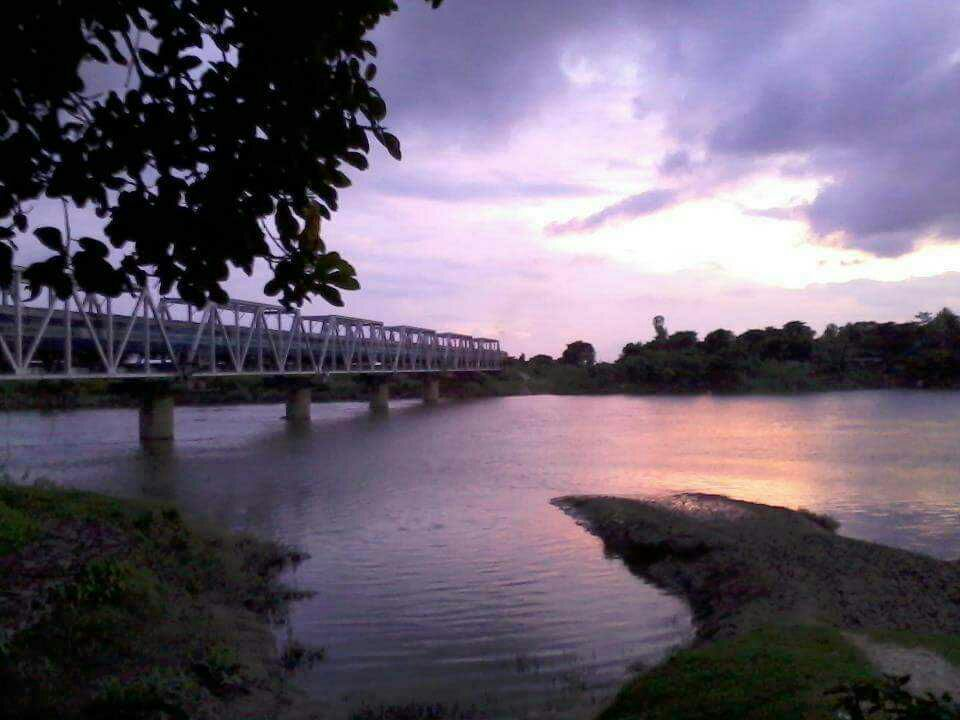
- The Punarbhaba River near Gangarampur Railway Station

Location
- Countries: India and Bangladesh
- State: West Bengal
- Divisions: Rajshahi and Rangpur

Physical characteristics
- Source: Dhepa River
  - location: Dinajpur, Dinajpur District, Bangladesh, Rangpur Division, Bangladesh
- Mouth: Mahananda River
  - location: Gomostapur Upazila, Nawabganj District, Rajshahi Division, Bangladesh
  - coordinates: 24°49′42″N 88°18′18″E
- Length: 160 km (99 mi)
- Discharge
  - location: Padma River

The Punarbhaba (also Poonorvoba; Bengali: পুনর্ভবা নদী, romanized: Punarabhabā Nadī) is a river of Bangladesh and India's West Bengal, with a total length of 160 kilometres (99 mi), a width of 3 to 8 kilometres (1.9 to 5.0 mi) and a mean depth of 1.96 metres (6.4 ft). It originates from the lowlands of Thakurgaon District of Bangladesh. The river's upper part is a few kilometres west of the Atrai. Dinajpur town of Bangladesh is situated on the east bank of the river. It flows through Gangarampur and Tapan community development blocks of Dakshin Dinajpur district of West Bengal. After flowing to the south, this river meets with the Dhepa River. Ultimately it flows into the Ganges.
