= SMVT Bengaluru–Balurghat Express =

Train in India

SMVT Bengaluru - Balurghat Express

Overview
- Service type: Express
- Status: Active
- Locale: Karnataka, Tamil Nadu, Andhra Pradesh, Odisha & West Bengal
- First service: 21 January 2026; 6 months ago
- Current operator: South Western (SW)

Route
- Stops: 43
- Distance travelled: 2,417 km (1,502 mi)
- Average journey time: 42h 0m
- Service frequency: Weekly
- Train number: 16523 / 16524

On-board services
- Classes: General, Sleeper, AC 3 Tier, AC 2 Tier
- Seating arrangements: Yes
- Sleeping arrangements: Yes
- Auto-rack arrangements: Overhead racks
- Catering facilities: E-catering
- Baggage facilities: Available
- Other facilities: Below the seats

Technical
- Rolling stock: LHB coaches
- Track gauge: 1,676 mm (5 ft 6 in)
- Electrification: 25 kV 50 Hz AC Overhead line
- Operating speed: 58 km/h (36 mph) average including halts
- Track owner: Indian Railways

The 16523 / 16524 SMVT Bengaluru–Balurghat Express is an express train belonging to South Western Railway zone that runs between the city SMVT Bengaluru of Karnataka and Balurghat of West Bengal in India.

It operates as train number 16523 from SMVT Bengaluru to Balurghat and as train number 16524 in the reverse direction, serving the state of Karnataka, Tamil Nadu, Andhra Pradesh, Odisha and West Bengal.

== Services ==
• 16523/ SMVT Bengaluru–Balurghat Express has an average speed of 58 km/h and covers 2417 km in 42h 0m.

• 16524/ Balurghat–SMVT Bengaluru has an average speed of 53 km/h and covers 2417 km in 45h 45m.

== Route and halts ==
The Important Halts of the train are :

- SMVT Bengaluru
- Krishnarajapuram
- Bangarapet Junction
- Kuppam
- Jolarpettai Junction
- Katpadi Junction
- Arakkonam Junction
- Perambur
- Nayudupeta
- Nellore
- Ongole
- Chirala
- Tenali Junction
- Vijayawada Junction
- Eluru
- Rajahmundry
- Samalkot Junction
- Anakapalle
- Duvvada
- Pendurti
- Kottavalasa Junction
- Vizianagaram Junction
- Srikakulam Road
- Brahmapur
- Balugaon
- Khurda Road Junction
- Bhubaneswar
- Cuttack Junction
- Jajpur Keonjhar Road
- Bhadrak
- Baleshwar
- Kharagpur Junction
- Andul
- Dankuni Junction
- Barddhaman Junction
- Bolpur Shantiniketan
- Rampurhat Junction
- Malda Town
- Eklakhi Junction
- Buniadpur
- Gangarampur
- Balurghat

== Schedule ==
• 16523 - 10:15 AM (Weekly) [SMVT Bengaluru]

• 16524 - 5:15 AM (Weekly) [Balurghat]

== Coach composition ==
16523 – UP (SMVT Bengaluru → Balurghat)
Loco	1	2	3	4	5	6	7	8	9	10	11	12	13	14	15	16	17	18	19	20	21	22
	SLRD	GEN	GEN	B6	B5	B4	B3	B2	B1	A2	A1	S8	S7	S6	S5	S4	S3	S2	S1	GEN	GEN	LPR
16524 – DOWN (Balurghat → SMVT Bengaluru)
Loco	1	2	3	4	5	6	7	8	9	10	11	12	13	14	15	16	17	18	19	20	21	22
	LPR	GEN	GEN	S1	S2	S3	S4	S5	S6	S7	S8	A1	A2	B1	B2	B3	B4	B5	B6	GEN	GEN	SLRD

== Traction ==
As the entire route is fully electrified it is hauled by a Siliguri Loco Shed-based WAP-7 electric locomotive from SMVT Bengaluru to Balurghat and vice versa.

== Rake reversal ==
No rake Reversal or rake share.

== See also ==
Trains from SMVT Bengaluru :

1. Anga Express
2. SMVT Bengaluru–Murdeshwar Express
3. SMVT Bangalore–Tirupati Intercity Express
4. Howrah–SMVT Bengaluru Duronto Express
5. SMVT Bengaluru–Alipurduar Amrit Bharat Express

Trains from Balurghat :

1. Howrah–Balurghat Bi-Weekly Express
2. Sealdah-Balurghat express
3. Balurghat–Siliguri Intercity Express
4. Tebhaga Express
5. Farakka Express (via Sultanpur)

== Notes ==
a. Runs 1 day in a week with both directions.
