= Sealdah–Balurghat Express =

Train in India

Sealdah–Balurghat–Sealdah Sealdah–Balurghat Express

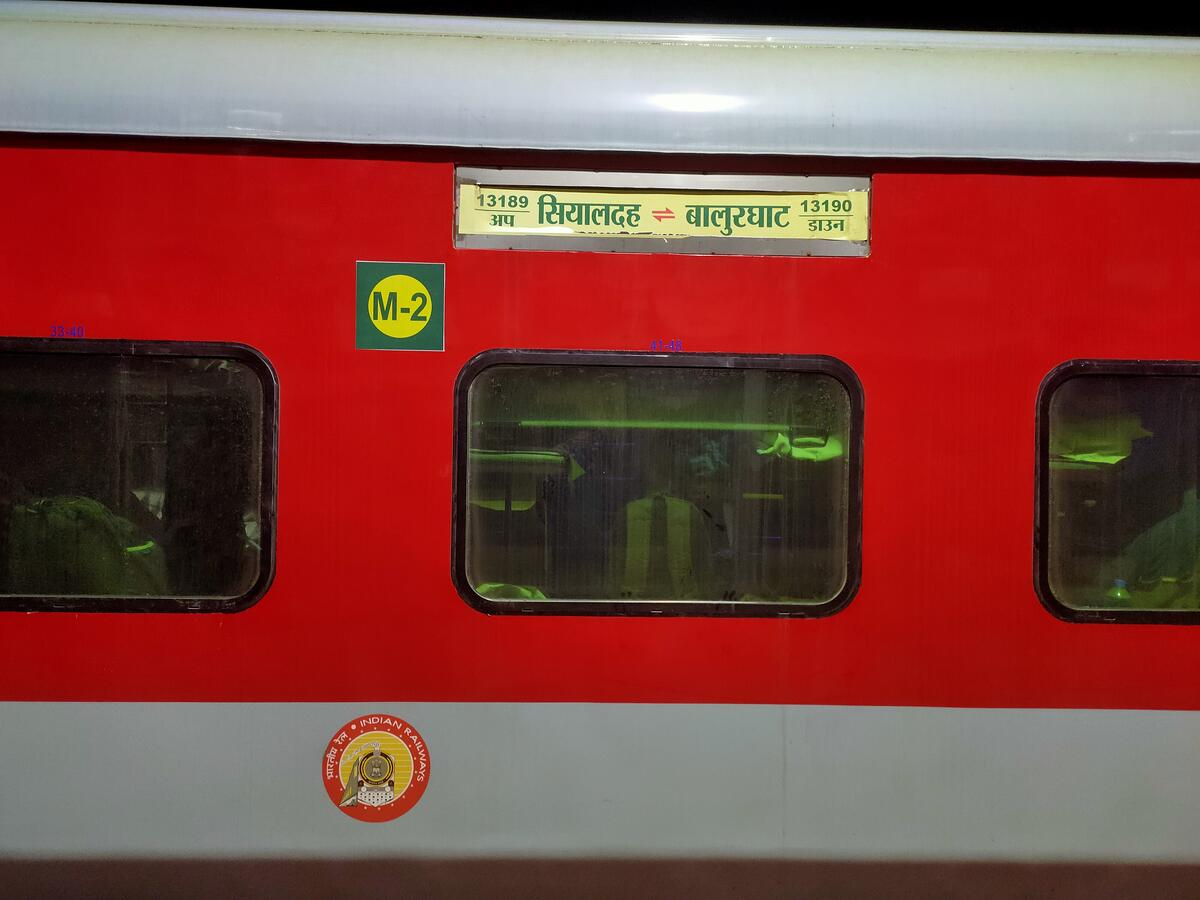
- Sealdah–Balurghat Express train board

Overview
- Service type: Mail / Express
- Status: Operational
- Locale: West Bengal
- Current operator: Eastern Railway

Route
- Stops: 13
- Distance travelled: 445 km
- Average journey time: 10 hrs
- Service frequency: Daily
- Train number: 13189 / 13190

On-board services
- Classes: AC First class, AC 2 Tier, AC 3 Tier, AC 3 Economy, Sleeper class, Second seating, General unreserved
- Seating arrangements: Yes
- Sleeping arrangements: Yes
- Auto-rack arrangements: Overhead racks
- Catering facilities: E‑catering available
- Observation facilities: Large windows
- Baggage facilities: Available
- Other facilities: Below the seats

Technical
- Rolling stock: LHB coaches
- Track gauge: Broad gauge
- Electrification: Yes
- Operating speed: 45 km/h average including halts

The Sealdah–Balurghat Express (train numbers 13189/13190) is an express train belonging to the Eastern Railway zone. It runs between Sealdah in Kolkata and Balurghat in Dakshin Dinajpur district, West Bengal. The service operates daily, covering a distance of 445 km in around 10 hours.

== Overview ==
The train connects major stations across West Bengal including Nabadwip Dham, Katwa Junction, Azimganj Junction, Malda Town, Eklakhi Junction, and Gazole. It serves as a key link between Kolkata and northern parts of the state, facilitating both day and night travel for passengers with a mix of reserved and unreserved classes.

== Route and halts ==
The important stations along the Sealdah–Balurghat Express route include:

- Sealdah
- Naihati Junction
- Bandel Junction
- Nabadwip Dham
- Katwa Junction
- Azimganj Junction
- Malda Town
- Eklakhi Junction
- Gazole
- Buniadpur
- Gangarampur
- Rampur Bazar
- Balurghat

== Timetable ==
=== 13189 – Sealdah to Balurghat ===
(Sealdah → Balurghat)

Station	Arrival	Departure
Sealdah	—	22:30
Naihati Junction	23:17	23:19
Bandel Junction	23:50	23:52
Nabadwip Dham	00:37	00:39
Katwa Junction	01:30	01:32
Azimganj Junction	02:35	02:40
Malda Town	05:30	05:32
Eklakhi Junction	06:02	06:05
Gazole	06:30	06:32
Buniadpur	06:55	06:57
Gangarampur	07:05	07:07
Rampur Bazar	07:30	07:32
Balurghat	08:30	—

13190–Sealdah–Balurghat Express (Balurghat → Sealdah)

Station	Arrival	Departure
Balurghat	—	19:00
Rampur Bazar	19:18	19:20
Gangarampur	19:32	19:34
Buniadpur	19:45	19:47
Gazole	20:18	20:20
Eklakhi Junction	20:38	20:40
Malda Town	21:30	21:40
New Farakka Junction	22:12	22:14
Jangipur Road	22:54	22:56
Azimganj Junction	23:52	23:57
Katwa Junction	00:55	01:00
Nabadwip Dham	01:28	01:33
Bandel Junction	02:33	02:35
Naihati Junction	03:12	03:14
Sealdah	04:25	—

== Classes ==
The train offers the following classes of travel:

- AC First class
- AC 2 Tier
- AC 3 Tier
- AC 3 Economy
- Sleeper class
- Second seating (2S)
- General unreserved

== Coach composition ==
The train uses LHB coaches in the following sequence:

Sealdah → Balurghat:

Loco	0	1	2	3	4	5	6	7	8	9	10	11	12	13	14	15	16
	L	SLR	GS	GS	S1	S2	S3	S4	M1	M2	B1	B2	A1	H1	GS	GS	EOG

Balurghat → Sealdah:

Loco	0	1	2	3	4	5	6	7	8	9	10	11	12	13	14	15	16
	EOG	GS	GS	H1	A1	B2	B1	M2	M1	S4	S3	S2	S1	GS	GS	SLR	L

== Traction ==
The train is hauled by an electric locomotive from the Electric Loco Shed, Howrah for its entire journey due to full route electrification.

== See also ==
- Eastern Railway zone
