= Howrah–Balurghat Bi-Weekly Express =

Train in India

Howrah Jn - Balurghat - Howrah Jn Howrah-Balurghat Express

Overview
- Service type: Express
- Locale: West Bengal
- First service: 13 October 2014; 11 years ago
- Current operator: Eastern Railway

Route
- Termini: Howrah (HWH); Balurghat (BLGT)
- Stops: 10
- Distance travelled: 439 km (273 mi)
- Average journey time: 10 hours approx.
- Service frequency: 5 days a week.
- Train number: 13063 / 13064

On-board services
- Classes: AC 2 Tier, AC 3 Tier, Sleeper Class, General Unreserved
- Seating arrangements: Yes
- Sleeping arrangements: Yes
- Catering facilities: E-Catering
- Observation facilities: Large Windows
- Baggage facilities: Available
- Other facilities: Below the seats

Technical
- Rolling stock: LHB coach
- Track gauge: 1,676 mm (5 ft 6 in) Broad Gauge
- Operating speed: 44 km/h (27 mph) average including halts.

The 13063 / 13064 Howrah–Balurghat Express is an express train belonging to Eastern Railway zone that runs between Howrah Junction and Balurghat in India. It is currently being operated with 13063/13064 train numbers everyday except of Saturday and Sunday.

== Overview ==
It runs on Mondays and Tuesdays of every week and connects important stations Such as Azimganj, Malda, Eklakhi and Buniadpur. It is the fastest Express bound for Balurghat other than Gour Express and Tebhaga Express. It runs via the Azimganj - Nalhati route. The 13063/Howrah – Balurghat Bi-Weekly Express has an average speed of 38 km/h and covers 439 km in 11h 35m. The 13064/Balurghat – Howrah Bi-Weekly Express has an average speed of 45 km/h and covers 439 km in 9h 45m.

== Timing and halts ==
The train departs from Platform #6 of Howrah Junction at 7:55 and arrives in Balurghat at Platform #2 at 19:30, the same day. From Platform #1Balurghat, the train departs at 20:30 and arrives in Howrah Junction at Platform #6 or #7 at 6:15, the next day.

The important halts of the train are:

- Howrah Junction
- Bandel Junction
- Nabadwip Dham
- Katwa Junction
- Azimganj Junction
- New Farakka Junction
- Malda Town
- Eklakhi Junction
- Gazole
- Buniadpur
- Gangarampur
- Balurghat

== Coach composition ==
Howrah to Balurghat:

Loco	1	2	3	4	5	6	7	8	9	10	11	12	13	14	15	16	17	18
	SLR	GEN	GEN	GEN	GEN	S1	S2	S3	S4	S5	S6	S7	S8	S9	B1	B2	A1	EOG

Balurghat to Howrah :

Loco	1	2	3	4	5	6	7	8	9	10	11	12	13	14	15	16	17	18
	EOG	A1	B2	B1	S9	S8	S7	S6	S5	S4	S3	S2	S1	GEN	GEN	GEN	GEN	SLR

== Traction ==
The route has been electrified, a Howrah Loco Shed based WAP-5 or WAP-7 electric locomotive from end to end.

== Rake sharing ==
The train shares its rakes with 13043/13044 Howrah - Raxaul Express.

== See also ==
- Howrah Junction railway station
- Balurghat railway station
- Howrah - Rampurhat Express
- Howrah - Siuri Intercity Express
