= Mahanagar railway station =

Railway station in West Bengal, India

Mahanagar

General information
- Location: Mahanagar, West Bengal; India
- Coordinates: 25.2476°N 88.2518°E
- Elevation: 36 metres (118 ft)
- System: Indian Railways station
- Owner: Indian Railways
- Line: Eklakhi–Balurghat branch line
- Platforms: 1
- Tracks: 1

Construction
- Structure type: Standard (on ground station)
- Parking: Available

Other information
- Status: Functioning
- Station code: MANG
- Zone(s): Northeast Frontier Railway
- Division(s): Katihar railway division
- Website: http://www.indianrail.gov.in

History
- Opened: 2004

Services
Preceding station	Indian Railways	Following station
Deotala towards ?	Northeast Frontier Railway Eklakhi–Balurghat branch line	Gazole towards ?
Location
- Location within West Bengal Location within India

Mahanagar Railway Station is a railway station located in Malda district in the Indian state of West Bengal. It serves the village of Mahanagar and the surrounding areas. Mahanagar station was built in 2004. A few trains, like the Gour Express, Malda Town–Balurghat passenger trains stop at Mahanagar railway station.
