= Malancha railway station =

Railway station in West Bengal, India

Malancha

General information
- Location: Malancha, Gangarampur, West Bengal, India
- Coordinates: 25.3608°N 88.6026°E
- Elevation: 31 metres (102 ft)
- System: Indian Railways station
- Owner: Indian Railways
- Line: Eklakhi–Balurghat branch line
- Platforms: 1
- Tracks: 1

Construction
- Structure type: Standard (on ground station)
- Parking: Available

Other information
- Status: Functioning
- Station code: MLNH
- Zone(s): Northeast Frontier Railway
- Division(s): Katihar
- Website: http://www.indianrail.gov.in

History
- Opened: 2004

Services
Preceding station	Indian Railways	Following station
Rampur Bazar towards ?	Northeast Frontier Railway Eklakhi–Balurghat branch line	Gangarampur towards ?
Location
- Location within West Bengal Location within India

Malancha railway station is located in Dakshin Dinajpur district in the Indian state of West Bengal. It serves Malancha, Fulbari village and the surrounding areas. Malancha station was built in 2004. A few trains, like the Gour Express, Malda Town–Balurghat passenger trains stop at the station.
