= Daulatpur railway station (South Dinajpur) =

Railway station in West Bengal, India

Daulatpur

General information
- Location: Daulatpur, West Bengal, India
- Coordinates: 25.3305°N 88.3367°E
- Elevation: 32 metres (105 ft)
- System: Indian Railways station
- Owner: Indian Railways
- Line: Eklakhi–Balurghat branch line
- Platforms: 1
- Tracks: 1

Construction
- Structure type: Standard (on-ground station)
- Parking: Available

Other information
- Status: Functioning
- Station code: DLPH
- Zone(s): Northeast Frontier Railway
- Division(s): Katihar
- Website: http://www.indianrail.gov.in

History
- Opened: 2004

Services
Preceding station	Indian Railways	Following station
Buniadpur towards ?	Northeast Frontier Railway Eklakhi–Balurghat branch line	Deotala towards ?
Location
- Location within West Bengal Location within India

Daulatpur railway station is located in Dakshin Dinajpur district in the Indian state of West Bengal. Built in 2004, the station serves Daulatpur village and the surrounding areas. A few trains, like the Gour Express, Malda Town–Balurghat passenger trains stop at Daulatpur railway station.
