= Tebhaga Express =

Train in India

Kolkata - Balurghat - Kolkata Tebhaga Express

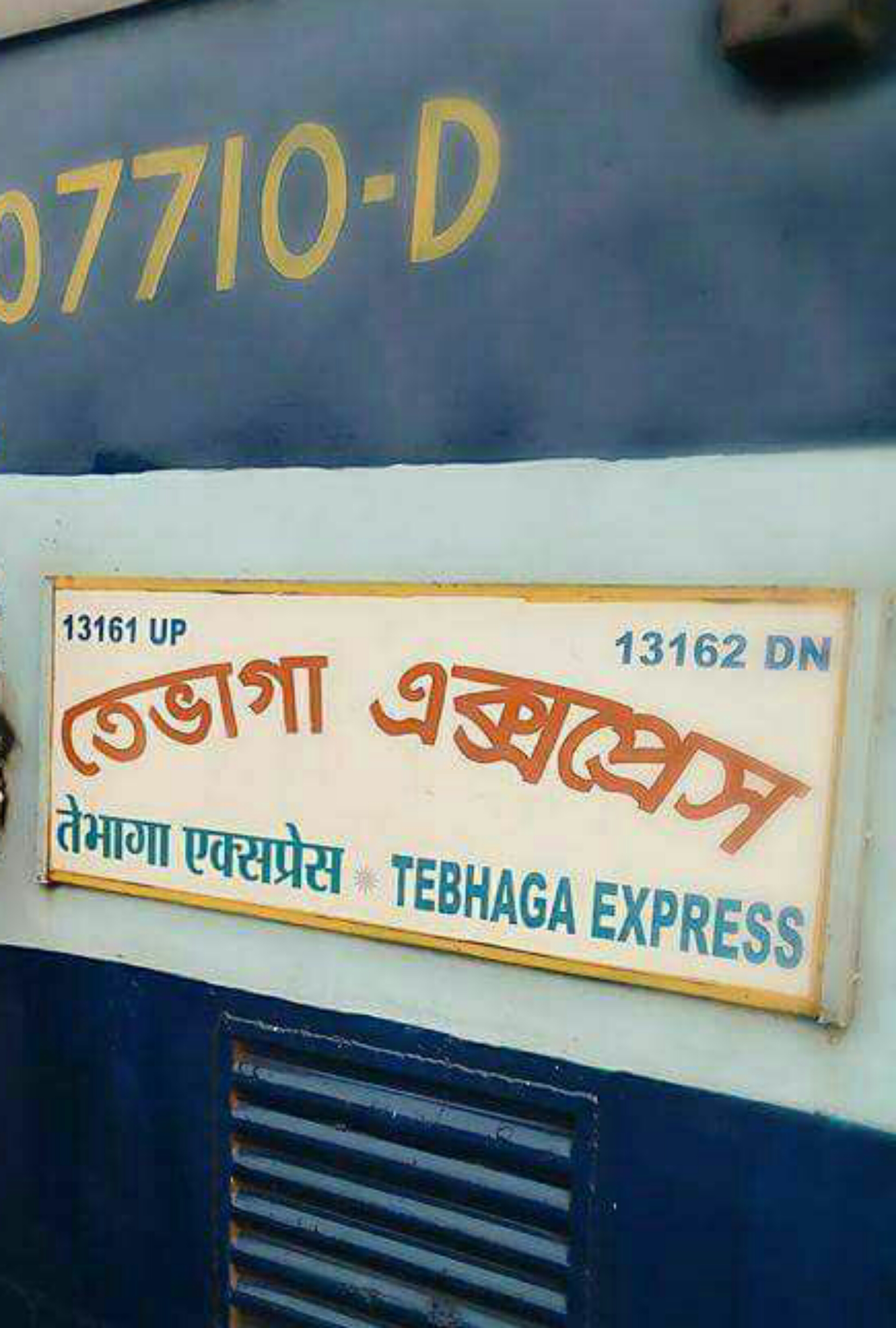
- Tebhaga Express train board.

Overview
- Service type: Mail / Express
- Status: Operational
- Locale: West Bengal
- First service: 25 November 2007; 18 years ago
- Current operator: Eastern Railway
- Ridership: 10000-20000 (monthly)

Route
- Stops: 12
- Distance travelled: 441 km (274 mi)
- Average journey time: 13161 - 9 hrs 5 mins 13162 - 8 hrs 30 mins
- Service frequency: 6 Days a week
- Train number: 13161 / 13162

On-board services
- Classes: AC 3 Tier, AC Chair Car, Sleeper Class, General Unreserved, Second Seating / Non AC Chair Car (Reserved)
- Seating arrangements: Yes
- Sleeping arrangements: Yes
- Auto-rack arrangements: Overhead racks
- Catering facilities: E-catering only
- Observation facilities: Large windows
- Baggage facilities: Available
- Other facilities: Below the seats

Technical
- Rolling stock: LHB coaches
- Track gauge: 1,676 mm (5 ft 6 in); Broad Gauge
- Operating speed: 51 km/h (32 mph) average including halts.

The 13161 / 13162 Tebhaga Express is an express train belonging to Eastern Railway Zone that runs between Kolkata and Balurghat via Rampurhat, Malda Town. It is operated with 13161 / 13162 train numbers on a hexa-weekly basis.

== Overview ==
The train is named after the Tebhaga movement of Bengal, as the strike also took place in Balurghat.

It runs on a hexa-weekly basis and connects important stations such as Barddhaman, Rampurhat, Shantiniketan, Malda Town and Buniadpur. It is a fully day train providing reserved and unreserved coaches and as well as Tatkal scheme. The train is known for its punctuality and cleanliness.

The 13161/KOAA-BLGT Tebhaga Express has an average speed of 46 km/h and covers 441 km in 9h 40m. The 13162/BLGT-KOAA Tebhaga Express has an average speed of 50 km/h and covers same distance in 8h 55m.

== Timetable ==
13161 – Tebhaga Express (Kolkata – Balurghat)

| Station | Arrival | Departure |
|---|---|---|
| Kolkata | — | 12:55 |
| Barddhaman Junction | 14:18 | 14:21 |
| Bolpur Shantiniketan | 15:05 | 15:08 |
| Rampurhat Junction | 16:07 | 16:12 |
| Murarai | 16:37 | 16:38 |
| Pakur | 16:59 | 17:01 |
| New Farakka Junction | 17:52 | 17:54 |
| Malda Town | 18:40 | 18:50 |
| Eklakhi Junction | 19:20 | 19:22 |
| Gazole | 19:35 | 19:37 |
| Buniadpur | 20:10 | 20:12 |
| Gangarampur | 20:23 | 20:25 |
| Rampur Bazar | 20:50 | 20:52 |
| Balurghat | 22:00 | — |

13162 – Tebhaga Express (Balurghat – Kolkata)

| Station | Arrival | Departure |
|---|---|---|
| Balurghat | — | 05:45 |
| Rampur Bazar | 06:03 | 06:05 |
| Gangarampur | 06:18 | 06:20 |
| Buniadpur | 06:31 | 06:33 |
| Gazole | 06:55 | 06:57 |
| Eklakhi Junction | 07:10 | 07:12 |
| Malda Town | 07:50 | 08:00 |
| New Farakka Junction | 08:32 | 08:34 |
| Pakur | 09:14 | 09:16 |
| Murarai | 09:36 | 09:37 |
| Rampurhat Junction | 10:06 | 10:11 |
| Bolpur Shantiniketan | 11:19 | 11:22 |
| Barddhaman Junction | 12:14 | 12:16 |
| Kolkata | 14:15 | — |

== Route and halts ==
The important stops of the train are:

- Kolkata
- Barddhaman Junction
- Bolpur Shantiniketan
- Rampurhat Junction
- Murarai
- Pakur
- New Farakka Junction
- Malda Town
- Eklakhi Junction
- Gazole
- Buniadpur
- Gangarampur
- Rampur Bazar
- Balurghat

Note: Bold letters indicates Major Railway Stations/Major Cities.

Earlier, the train was used with ICF coaches. The train used to run with 22 standard coaches. From December 2025, brand new LHB coaches have been attached to it.

- 3 AC III Tier (LWACCN)
- 1 AC Chair Car (LWSACCN)
- 5 Sleeper Coaches (LWSCN)
- 7 second class (2S) reservation (LWSCZ)
- 4 general unreserved (LWS)
- 1 SLRD (ladies/disabled) cum luggage car (LSLRD)
- 1 Generator Car (Vestibuled Luggage Car) (LWLRRM)

== Coach composition ==
Kolkata to Balurghat:

| Loco | 1 | 2 | 3 | 4 | 5 | 6 | 7 | 8 | 9 | 10 | 11 | 12 | 13 | 14 | 15 | 16 | 17 | 18 | 19 | 20 | 21 | 22 |
|---|---|---|---|---|---|---|---|---|---|---|---|---|---|---|---|---|---|---|---|---|---|---|
| | SLRD | GEN | GEN | S1 | S2 | S3 | S4 | S5 | D1 | D2 | D3 | D4 | D5 | D6 | D7 | C1 | B1 | B2 | B3 | GEN | GEN | EOG |

Balurghat to Kolkata:

| Loco | 1 | 2 | 3 | 4 | 5 | 6 | 7 | 8 | 9 | 10 | 11 | 12 | 13 | 14 | 15 | 16 | 17 | 18 | 19 | 20 | 21 | 22 |
|---|---|---|---|---|---|---|---|---|---|---|---|---|---|---|---|---|---|---|---|---|---|---|
| | EOG | GEN | GEN | B3 | B2 | B1 | C1 | D7 | D6 | D5 | D4 | D3 | D2 | D1 | S5 | S4 | S3 | S2 | S1 | GEN | GEN | SLRD |

== Traction ==
Previously, this train ran with diesel traction WDM-3A, WDM-3D and WDM-2. As the entire route is electrified, the train is usually hauled by a Howrah Loco Shed-based WAP-4 electric locomotive for its entire journey.
