= Mallickpurhat railway station =

Railway station in West Bengal, India

Mallickpurhat

General information
- Location: Mallikpur, West Bengal, India
- Coordinates: 25.3227°N 88.6916°E
- Elevation: 30 metres (98 ft)
- System: Indian Railways station
- Owner: Indian Railways
- Line: Eklakhi–Balurghat branch line
- Platforms: 1
- Tracks: 1

Construction
- Structure type: Standard (on ground station)
- Parking: Available

Other information
- Status: Functioning
- Station code: MKRH
- Zone(s): Northeast Frontier Railway
- Division(s): Katihar
- Website: http://www.indianrail.gov.in

History
- Opened: 2004

Services
Preceding station	Indian Railways	Following station
Balurghat towards ?	Northeast Frontier Railway Eklakhi–Balurghat branch line	Rampur Bazar towards ?
Location
- Location within West Bengal Location within India

Mallickpurhat railway station is located in Dakshin Dinajpur district in the Indian state of West Bengal. It serves Mallikpur, Baul village and the surrounding areas. Mallickpurhat station was built in 2004. A few trains, like the Gour Express, Malda Town–Balurghat passenger trains stop at this station.
