= Farakka Express (via Sultanpur) =

Train in India

15733/15734 Farakka Express (via Sultanpur)
Overview
- Service type: Express
- First service: 1 October 1963; 63 years ago as 13 UP/14 DN
- Current operator: Northeast Frontier Railway after extension in 2024

Route
- Termini: Balurghat (BLGT); Bathinda (BTI)
- Stops: 72
- Distance travelled: 1,832 km (1,138 mi)
- Average journey time: 43 hrs 45 mins
- Service frequency: Tri-weekly
- Train number: 15733 / 15734

On-board services
- Classes: AC first, AC 2 Tier, AC 3 Tier, Sleeper class, General Unreserved
- Seating arrangements: Yes
- Sleeping arrangements: No
- Catering facilities: Available
- Observation facilities: Large windows
- Baggage facilities: Available
- Other facilities: Below the seats

Technical
- Rolling stock: LHB coach
- Track gauge: Broad gauge
- Operating speed: 42 km/h (26 mph) average including halts

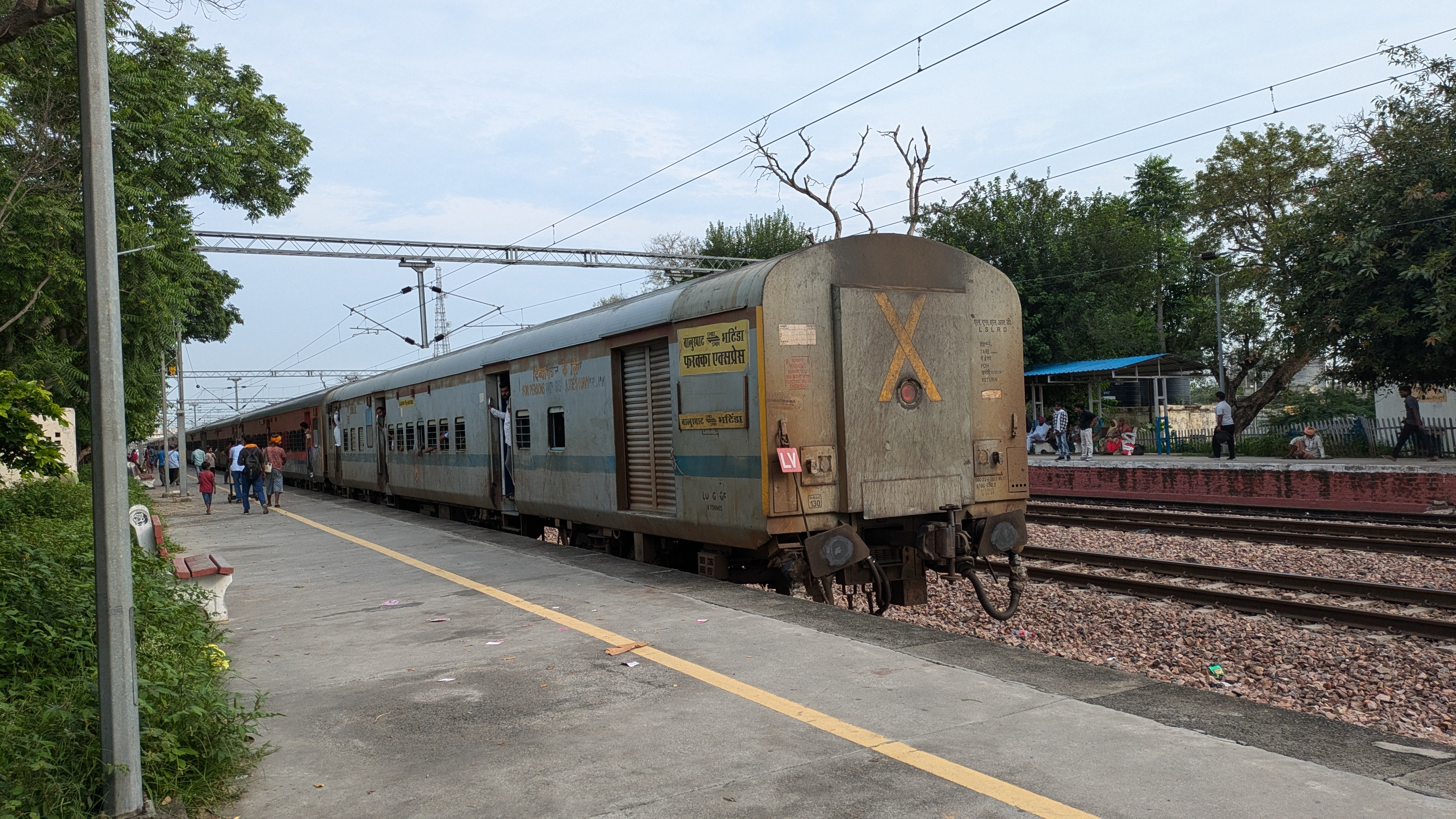
Farakka rake cruising on loop line

The 15733 / 15734 Farakka Express (via Sultanpur) is an Express train of Indian Railways connecting Balurghat in Dakshin Dinajpur district of West Bengal with Bathinda district of Punjab. This train is in much demand from the people of the district of Malda and Murshidabad.

== History ==
Originally on 1963, The Farakka Express was started from now abandoned Farakka Railway Station (FKK) by the Late Gani Khan Chowdhury. The train was scheduled to run 3 days via Sultanpur & 4 days via Ayodhya. From 1963-1973, Farakka Express via Sultanpur used to depart Farakka at 23.00 PM, reaching Delhi Junction on 3rd day morning at 04.30 AM. Meanwhile Farakka Express via Ayodhya used to same timings till Varanasi & reaching Delhi Junction on 3rd day morning at 06.00 AM. After Farakka Barrage was made, Old Farakka Station was closed, New Farakka Junction was made & the train got extended to Malda Town. From 1975 to 2000, timings of Farakka Express via Sultanpur was Malda Town departure 21.45 PM & Delhi Junction arrival on 3rd day morning 04.35 AM. Timings of Farakka Express via Ayodhya was Malda Town departure 21.45 PM & Delhi Junction arrival on 3rd day morning 06.05 AM. In 2001, both the trains was extended to Bhiwani Junction until 2009. From 2009 both the Farakka Express was running only between Malda Town & Delhi Junction until 2024. On 2024, both the trains were extended to Balurghat & Bathinda Junction & slowed down disastrously.

== Route & halts ==
- Balurghat
- Eklakhi Junction
- Malda Town
- New Farakka Junction
- Barharwa Junction
- Sahibganj Junction
- Bhagalpur Junction
- Jamalpur Junction
- Kiul Junction
- Barh
- Patna Junction
- Danapur
- Pt. Deen Dayal Upadhyaya Jn.
- Dildarnagar Junction
- Varanasi Junction
- Jaunpur City
- Sultanpur Junction
- Lucknow Charbagh
- Unnao Junction
- Kanpur Central
- Aligarh Junction
- Khurja Junction
- Tundla Junction
- Delhi Shahdara Junction
- Delhi Junction
- Sonipat Junction
- Narela Railway Station
- Jind Junction
- Jakhal Junction
- Bathinda Junction

== Traction ==
As the route is fully electrified, it is hauled by a Howrah Loco Shed based WAP-5 / WAP-7 electric locomotive on its entire journey.

== Rake sharing ==
The train shares its rake with 15743/ 15744 Farakka Express (via Ayodhya Cantt.).

== Coach composition ==
Coach composition of this train is as follows: EOG-2, SL-9, GEN-7, 3AC-3, 2AC-1, PC-1; Total= 23 coaches

== Schedule ==
- 15733 Farakka Express leaves Balurghat station at 17:00 on Monday, Thursday, Saturday and reaches Bathinda Junction at 12:45 on third day.
- 15734 Farakka Express departs Bathinda Junction at 16:30 on Monday, Wednesday, Saturday and reaches Balurghat station 12:15 on third day.

Services of Pantry car and Tatkal scheme is available in this train.
