= Itahar Junction railway station =

Railway Station in West Bengal, India

Itahar Junction

General information
- Location: Bhadrashila, Uttar Dinajpur district, West Bengal; India
- Elevation: 30 metres (98 ft)
- System: Indian Railways station
- Owner: Indian Railways
- Operator: Northeast Frontier Railway zone
- Lines: Dalkhola–Raiganj–Gazole line Itahar–Buniadpur line
- Connections: Auto stand

Construction
- Structure type: Standard (on-ground station)
- Parking: No
- Cycle facilities: No

Other information
- Status: Planned
- Station code: ITHAR
- Zone(s): Northeast Frontier Railway zone
- Division(s): Katihar

Itahar Junction railway station is a railway junction in Uttar Dinajpur district, West Bengal. Its code is ITHAR. It is to serve Itahar town and is planned to be a junction on the new Dalkhola–Raiganj–Gazole line with a link to Buniadpur via Harirampur.
