= Balurghat–Haldibari Intercity Express =

Train of India

Balurghat - Siliguri - Balurghat Intercity Express

Overview
- Service type: Express
- Locale: West Bengal, Bihar
- First service: 1 February 2010; 16 years ago
- Current operator: Northeast Frontier Railway zone

Route
- Termini: Balurghat; Siliguri Junction
- Stops: 16
- Distance travelled: 323 km (201 mi)
- Average journey time: 7 hours 0 mins
- Service frequency: Daily
- Train number: 15463 / 15464

On-board services
- Class: general unreserved
- Seating arrangements: Yes
- Sleeping arrangements: No
- Auto-rack arrangements: Overhead Racks
- Catering facilities: No
- Observation facilities: Large Windows
- Entertainment facilities: The Agriculture
- Baggage facilities: Available

Technical
- Rolling stock: Standard Indian Railways Coaches
- Track gauge: 1,676 mm (5 ft 6 in)
- Operating speed: 44 km/h (27 mph)

The 15463/64 Balurghat – Siliguri Junction Intercity Express is an Express train belonging to Indian Railways Northeast Frontier Railway zone that runs between Balurghat and Siliguri Junction in India.

It operates as train number 15463 from Balurghat to Siliguri Junction and as train number 15464 operates from Siliguri to Balurghat & This train serves the state of West Bengal & Bihar

- AS OF 11TH MARCH 2026 , THIS TRAIN IS NOW EXTENDED UPTO HALDIBARI ALONG WITH HALTS AT Jalpaiguri and Belakoba and it reverses it's direction at New Jalpaiguri Junction to go Balurghat via Siliguri Junction.

== Coaches ==
The 15463 / 64 Balurghat – Siliguri Junction Intercity Express has ten general unreserved & two SLR (seating with luggage rake) coaches . It does not carry a pantry car coach.

As is customary with most train services in India, coach composition may be amended at the discretion of Indian Railways depending on demand.

== Service ==
The 15463 Balurghat – Siliguri Junction Intercity Express covers the distance of 323 km (201 mi) in 6 hours 55 minutes (47 km/h) & in 7 hours 45 minutes as the 15464 Siliguri Junction – Balurghat Intercity Express (41 km/h).

As the average speed of the train is lower than 55 km/h (34 mph), as per railway rules, its fare doesn't includes a Superfast surcharge.

== Route and timing ==
The 15463 / 15464 Balurghat – Siliguri Junction Intercity Express runs between Balurghat and Siliguri Junction via Eklakhi Junction, Aluabari Road Junction & Thakurganj passing states like West Bengal & Bihar

Station	15463 (Balurghat → Siliguri Jn) Arrival	15463 (Balurghat → Siliguri Jn) Departure	15464 (Siliguri Jn → Balurghat) Arrival	15464 (Siliguri Jn → Balurghat) Departure
Balurghat	—	12:15	15:15	—
Gangarampur	12:41	12:43	13:10	13:12
Buniadpur	12:54	12:56	12:52	13:10
Gazole	13:18	13:20	12:25	12:50
Eklakhi Junction	14:05	14:20	11:55	12:23
Samsi	14:22	14:35	11:25	11:45
Bhaluka Road	14:37	14:48	11:12	11:23
Harischandrapur	14:50	15:30	11:00	11:10
Barsoi Junction	15:32	15:55	10:12	10:58
Dalkolha	15:57	16:18	09:47	10:10
Kishanganj	16:20	16:45	09:22	09:45
Aluabari Road Junction	16:47	16:59	08:58	09:20
Taiabpur	17:00	17:10	08:45	08:56
Thakurganj	17:12	17:29	08:35	08:44
Galgalia	17:30	17:32	08:21	08:23
Adhikari	17:41	17:43	08:32	08:34
Naxalbari	17:57	18:15	07:59	08:20
Bagdogra	18:16	19:10	07:45	07:58
Siliguri Junction	19:10	—	—	07:30

== Traction ==
As the entire route of the train is fully electrified, it is generally hauled by a high-horsepower WAP-7 electric locomotive. The locomotive is typically provided by the Siliguri Junction (SGUJ) Loco Shed. The WAP-7 class locomotive is well-suited for Intercity Express services due to its ability to haul long passenger rakes efficiently at higher speeds while ensuring smooth acceleration and reliable performance. The use of electric traction also contributes to reduced operational costs and lower environmental impact compared to diesel traction.

== Rake sharing ==
The 15463/15464 Balurghat–Siliguri Junction Intercity Express shares its rake under a Rake Sharing Arrangement (RSA) with the following services. The rake cycle is maintained in the sequence shown below:

55465 → 15468 → 15464 → 55422 → 55421 → 15463 → 15467 → 55466

- 55465 – Alipurduar – Bamanhat Passenger
- 15468 – Bamanhat – Siliguri Intercity Express
- 15464 – Siliguri Junction – Balurghat Intercity Express
- 55422 – Balurghat – Malda Town Passenger
- 55421 – Malda Town – Balurghat Passenger
- 15463 – Balurghat – Siliguri Junction Intercity Express
- 15467 – Siliguri Junction – Bamanhat Intercity Express
- 55466 – Bamanhat – Alipurduar Passenger

The rake maintenance and primary examination are carried out as per the operational cycle at the designated maintenance depot.
