= Ithar =

Ithar may refer to

- Īthār, altruism in Islam
- ITHAR, Itahar Junction railway station
