= Farakka Express (via Ayodhya Cantt) =

Train in India

15743/15744 Farakka Express (via Ayodhya Cantt)
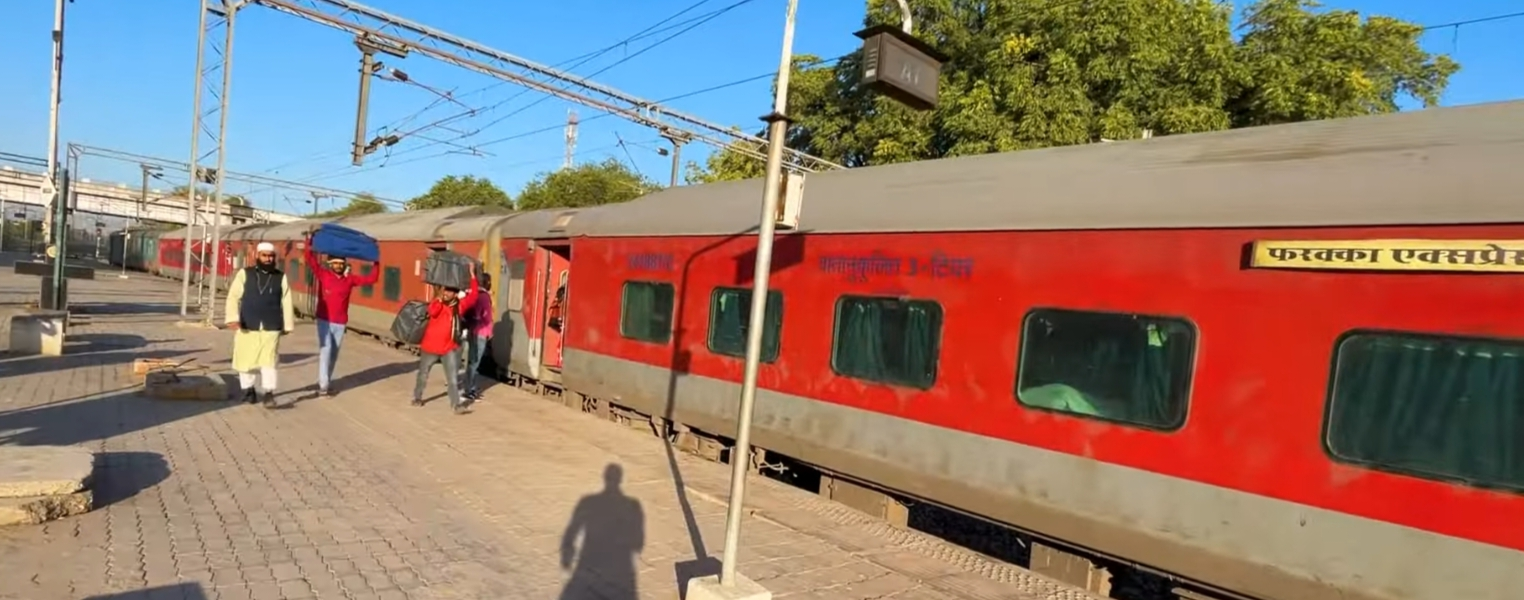
- Farakka Express At Unnao Junction

Overview
- Service type: Express
- First service: 1 October 1963; 63 years ago as 83 UP/84 DN
- Current operator: Northeast Frontier Railway after extension in 2024.

Route
- Termini: Balurghat (BLGT); Bathinda (BTI)
- Stops: 69
- Distance travelled: 1,864 km (1,158 mi)
- Average journey time: 42 hrs 45 mins for 15743 & 44 hrs 25 mins for 15744
- Service frequency: 4 days a week. (Note: Runs four days in a week for every direction.)
- Train number: 15743 / 15744

On-board services
- Classes: AC 1st Class, AC 2 tier, AC 3 tier, AC 3 tier Economy, Sleeper class, General Unreserved
- Seating arrangements: No
- Sleeping arrangements: Yes
- Catering facilities: Available
- Observation facilities: Large windows
- Baggage facilities: Available
- Other facilities: Below the seats

Technical
- Rolling stock: LHB coach
- Track gauge: 1,676 mm (5 ft 6 in)
- Operating speed: 43.60 km/h (27 mph) for 15743 & 42 km/h (26 mph) for 15744 average including halts

The 15743 / 15744 Farakka Express (via Ayodhya Cantt) is an Express train belonging to the Northeast Frontier Railway zone that runs between Balurghat and Bathinda Junction in India on four days in a week basis.

== History ==
Originally on 1963, The Farakka Express was started from now abandoned Farakka Railway Station (FKK) by the Late Gani Khan Chowdhury. The train was scheduled to run 3 days via Sultanpur & 4 days via Ayodhya. From 1963-1973, Farakka Express via Sultanpur used to depart Farakka at 23.00 PM, reaching Delhi Junction on 3rd day morning at 04.30 AM. Meanwhile Farakka Express via Ayodhya used to same timings till Varanasi & reaching Delhi Junction on 3rd day morning at 06.00 AM. After Farakka Barrage was made, Old Farakka Station was closed, New Farakka Junction was made & the train got extended to Malda Town. From 1975 to 2000, timings of Farakka Express via Sultanpur was Malda Town departure 21.45 PM & Delhi Junction arrival on 3rd day morning 04.35 AM. Timings of Farakka Express via Ayodhya was Malda Town departure 21.45 PM & Delhi Junction arrival on 3rd day morning 06.05 AM. In 2001, both the trains was extended to Bhiwani Junction until 2009. From 2009 both the Farakka Express was running only between Malda Town & Delhi Junction until 2024. On 2024, both the trains were extended to Balurghat & Bathinda Junction & slowed down disastrously.

== Route and halts ==
- Balurghat
- Eklakhi Junction
- Malda Town
- New Farakka Junction
- Barharwa Junction
- Sahibganj Junction
- Bhagalpur Junction
- Jamalpur Junction
- Kiul Junction
- Patna Junction
- Danapur
- Pt. Deen Dayal Upadhyaya Jn.
- Varanasi Junction
- Jaunpur Junction
- Ayodhya Junction
- Barabanki Junction
- Lucknow Charbagh
- Unnao Junction
- Kanpur Central
- Etawah Junction
- Tundla Junction
- Aligarh Junction
- Ghaziabad Junction
- Delhi Shahdara Junction
- Delhi Junction
- Rohtak Junction
- Jind Junction
- Jakhal Junction
- Bathinda Junction

== Service ==
Currently the 15743/15744 Farakka Express has an average speed of 43.60 kilometres per hour (27.09 mph) and covers 1,864 kilometres (1,158 mi) in 42 hrs 45 mins. 15743 departs Balurghat at 17.00 hrs & reaches Bathinda Junction at 11.45 AM on 3rd day. 15744 departs Bathinda Junction at 15.50 PM & reaches Balurghat at 12.15 PM on 3rd day covering 1,864 kilometres (1,158 mi) in 44 hrs 25 mins having an average speed of 42 kilometres per hour (26 mph).

== Coach composition ==
The train has standard LHB rakes with a max speed of 130 kmph. The train consists of 22 coaches:

- 1 AC 1st Class Sleeper
- 1 AC II Tier
- 7 AC III Tier
- 1 AC III Tier Economy
- 6 Sleeper coaches
- 1 Pantry car
- 3 General
- 2 Seating cum Luggage Rake

== Traction ==
As the route is now fully electrified, it is hauled by a Howrah Loco Shed based WAP-5 / WAP-7 electric locomotive on its entire journey.

== Rake sharing ==
The train shares its rake with 15733 / 15734 Farakka Express (via Sultanpur).

== See also ==
- Malda Town railway station
- Delhi Junction railway station
- Farakka Express
- Malda Town–New Delhi Express
