= Balurghat =

- City
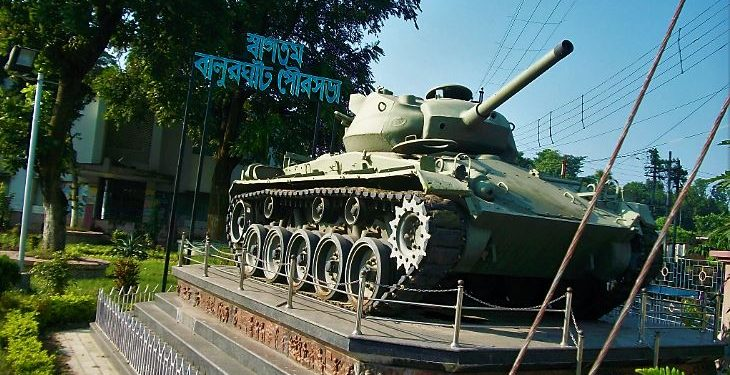
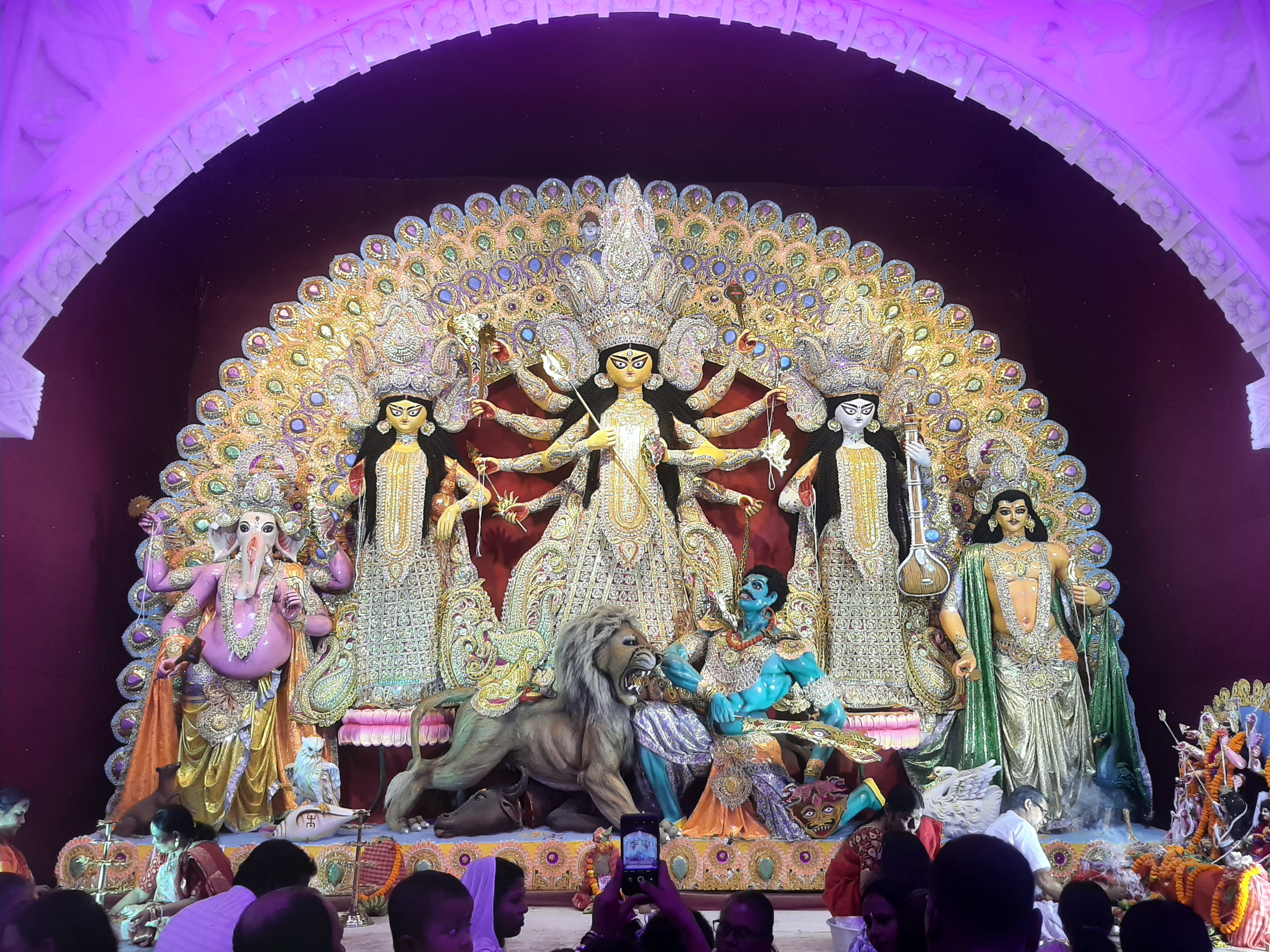
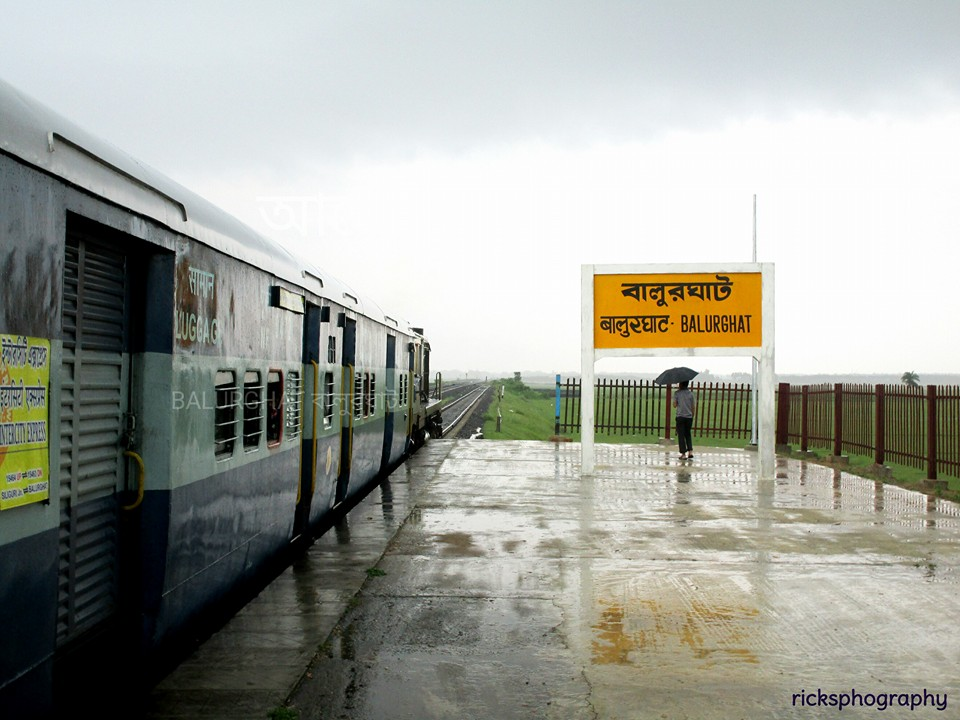
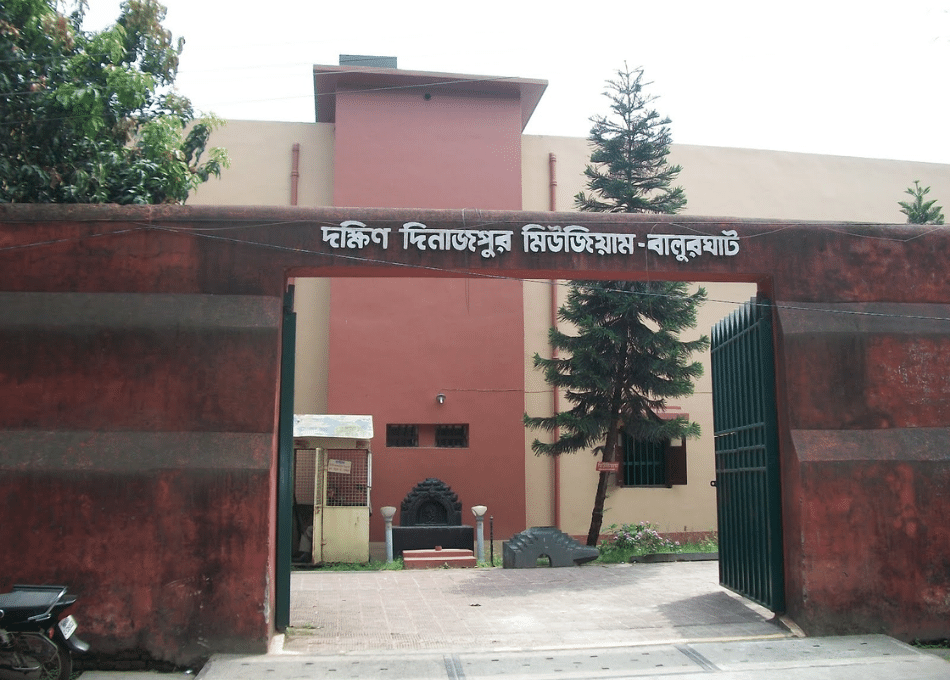
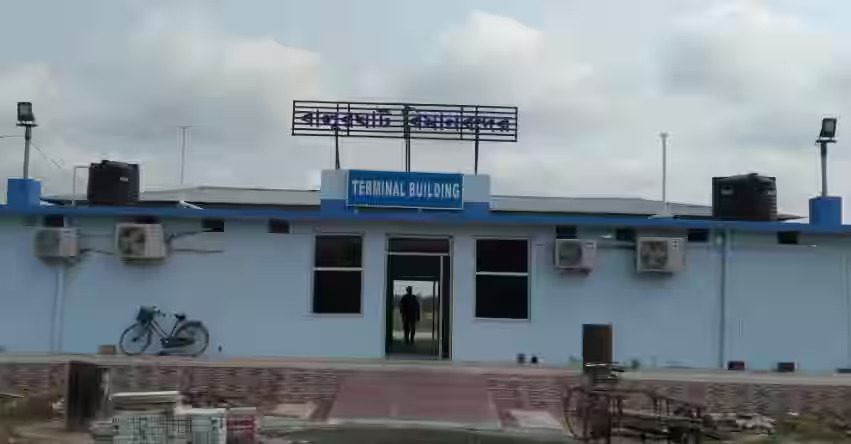
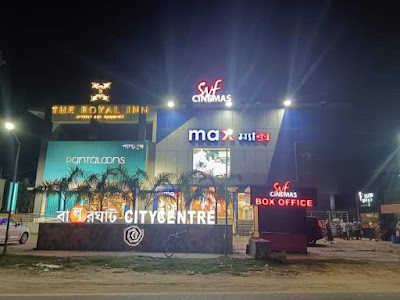
- 1971 War Tank More Balurghat Durga Puja in Balurghat Balurghat Railway Station Balurghat Museum Balurghat Airport City Centre Balurghat

- Location in West Bengal, India Balurghat (India)
- Coordinates: 25.22°N 88.76°E
- Country: India
- State: West Bengal
- Division: Malda division
- District: Dakshin Dinajpur
- Subdivision: Balurghat subdivision

Government
  - Type: Municipality
  - Body: Balurghat Municipality
  - Chairman: Surajit Saha (TMC)

Area
  - Total: 10.76 km^{2} (4.15 sq mi)
- Elevation: 24 m (79 ft)

Population (2011)
  - Total: 151,416
  - Density: 14,070/km^{2} (36,450/sq mi)
  - City Rank: 20th in West Bengal

Languages
  - Official: Bengali
  - Additional official: English
- Time zone: UTC+5:30 (IST)
- PIN: 733101, 733102, 733103
- Telephone code: 03522
- Vehicle registration: WB-61 to WB-62
- Lok Sabha constituency: Balurghat
- Vidhan Sabha constituency: Balurghat
- Airport: Balurghat Airport
- Transit: Highway: NH-512; Railway: BLGT
- City Development Authority: NBDD
- Website: Government of West Bengal; Dakshin Dinajpur; Balurghat Municipality; Dakshin Dinajpur Zilla Parishad

Balurghat is a city and municipality in the Dakshin Dinajpur district of West Bengal, India, and serves as the district headquarters. Located along National Highway 512 and the Atrai River, it is an important center for trade, education, and administration. The local economy is mainly based on agriculture, especially rice cultivation, along with small-scale industries. Its proximity to the Bangladesh border also gives it strategic importance.

== History ==
=== Ancient period ===
Balurghat and its surrounding regions have a history that dates back to ancient times. Archaeological evidence suggests that the area was part of the Pundravardhana kingdom, which flourished between the 4th century BCE and the 6th century CE. Inscriptions and artefacts from the Gupta period found near the Balurghat region indicate its historical significance as a center of trade and culture. The presence of ancient terracotta and pottery artefacts further underscores its cultural and commercial connections during this era.

=== Medieval period ===
During the medieval period, the region came under the influence of various dynasties, including the Palas and Senas. The strategic location of Balurghat, near the banks of the Atrai River, made it an important hub for trade and agriculture. With the establishment of Islamic rule in Bengal in the 13th century, the area experienced significant socio-economic and cultural transformations. The remnants of mosques and tombs from this period are evidence of the Islamic architectural influence in the region.

=== Colonial period ===
The modern history of Balurghat began to take shape during the British colonial era. It was a part of the Dinajpur district under the Bengal Presidency. The region witnessed significant administrative and infrastructural development during the 19th and early 20th centuries, including the introduction of railways and educational institutions. However, the Partition of Bengal in 1947 profoundly impacted Balurghat, as it became a border town with East Pakistan (now Bangladesh). This led to demographic changes due to migration and economic shifts caused by the disruption of traditional trade routes.

=== Post-independence period ===
After Indian independence, Balurghat became the district headquarters of West Dinajpur in West Bengal. The town developed as an administrative and cultural center. Over the years, it has grown in prominence due to its strategic location near the India-Bangladesh border. Initiatives for regional connectivity and cross-border trade have further boosted its economic importance. The establishment of institutions like Balurghat College in 1948 and Dakshin Dinajpur University in 2018 contributed to the town's educational growth.

=== Modern developments ===
In recent years, Balurghat has witnessed urbanisation and infrastructural development, including improved road and rail connectivity. Cultural festivals like the Durga Puja & Christmas highlight the town's rich heritage and attract visitors. Its proximity to significant natural and historical sites makes Balurghat a growing center for tourism in West Bengal.

== Geography ==
=== Location ===
In the map alongside, all places marked on the map are linked in the full screen version.

Cities and towns in the Dakshin Dinajpur district
M: municipal city/ town, CT: census town, R: rural/ urban centre, H: historical site
Owing to space constraints in the small map, the actual locations in a larger map may vary slightly.

Balurghat is at 25.22°N 88.77°E. It has an average elevation of 25 metres (82 feet). The town covers 10.76 km^{2} (4.15 sq mi) of area.

River Atreyee runs across the city, dividing it into disproportionate halves. The heart of the city, with important administrative, cultural and entertainment hubs, is on the eastern bank of the river. India-Bangladesh border is approximately 3 km from the town.

=== Police stations ===
Balurghat police station under West Bengal police has jurisdiction over Balurghat municipal area and Balurghat CD Block. Balurghat Women police station has jurisdiction over Balurghat subdivision.

=== Subdivision and CD block HQ ===
Balurghat subdivision has its headquarters at Balurghat. The headquarters of Balurghat CD block is at Balurghat.

=== Climate ===
Climate data for Balurghat (1991–2020, extremes 1960–2012)
| Month | Jan | Feb | Mar | Apr | May | Jun | Jul | Aug | Sep | Oct | Nov | Dec | Year |
|---|---|---|---|---|---|---|---|---|---|---|---|---|---|
| Record high °C (°F) | 32.0 (89.6) | 34.9 (94.8) | 39.1 (102.4) | 42.2 (108.0) | 43.4 (110.1) | 43.0 (109.4) | 40.0 (104.0) | 38.8 (101.8) | 37.0 (98.6) | 38.0 (100.4) | 35.5 (95.9) | 33.0 (91.4) | 43.4 (110.1) |
| Mean daily maximum °C (°F) | 24.3 (75.7) | 27.8 (82.0) | 32.1 (89.8) | 34.6 (94.3) | 34.8 (94.6) | 34.4 (93.9) | 33.5 (92.3) | 33.6 (92.5) | 33.4 (92.1) | 32.3 (90.1) | 29.2 (84.6) | 26.3 (79.3) | 31.4 (88.5) |
| Mean daily minimum °C (°F) | 11.4 (52.5) | 15.1 (59.2) | 19.4 (66.9) | 22.5 (72.5) | 24.2 (75.6) | 25.1 (77.2) | 24.9 (76.8) | 24.9 (76.8) | 24.7 (76.5) | 23.2 (73.8) | 18.4 (65.1) | 14.1 (57.4) | 20.7 (69.3) |
| Record low °C (°F) | 4.1 (39.4) | 6.2 (43.2) | 9.7 (49.5) | 12.4 (54.3) | 14.8 (58.6) | 14.8 (58.6) | 17.0 (62.6) | 16.8 (62.2) | 16.2 (61.2) | 12.2 (54.0) | 7.3 (45.1) | 4.7 (40.5) | 4.1 (39.4) |
| Average rainfall mm (inches) | 7.1 (0.28) | 6.3 (0.25) | 12.1 (0.48) | 52.2 (2.06) | 145.9 (5.74) | 261.7 (10.30) | 324.1 (12.76) | 241.8 (9.52) | 269.9 (10.63) | 112.5 (4.43) | 7.2 (0.28) | 2.7 (0.11) | 1,443.4 (56.83) |
| Average rainy days | 0.5 | 0.5 | 0.6 | 2.8 | 6.5 | 10.1 | 10.9 | 9.4 | 8.4 | 3.3 | 0.4 | 0.1 | 53.7 |
| Average relative humidity (%) (at 17:30 IST) | 76 | 70 | 65 | 69 | 73 | 78 | 80 | 81 | 82 | 82 | 81 | 80 | 76 |
Source: India Meteorological Department

== Demographics ==
Religion in Balurghat (2011)
| Hinduism | 98.74% |
| Islam | 0.49% |
| Other or not stated | 0.77% |

Languages of Balurghat (2011)
1. Bengali (94.4%)
2. Hindi (3.40%)
3. Santali (1.37%)
4. Others (0.82%)

In the 2011 census, Balurghat municipality had a population of 153,279 of which 76,730 were males and 76,549 were females. The Balurghat urban agglomeration had a population of 164,593, out of which 82,466 were males and 82,127 were females. The 0–6 years population was 10,349. Effective literacy rate for the 7+ population was 91.66 per cent.

As of 2001 India census, Balurghat municipality had a population of 151,416, of which 75,794 were males and 75,622 were females. Balurghat has an average literacy rate of 84.8%, with 87% of the males and 82.5% of females literate. Population in the age range of 0–6 years is 10,677. The Scheduled Castes and Scheduled Tribes have a population of 15,204 and 3,008 respectively. Balurghat had 37,507 households in 2011.

98.7% of the population are Hindus, with small percentages (below 1%) of Muslims and Sikhs.

At the time of the 2011 census, 94.41% of the population of Balurghat Municipality spoke Bengali, 3.40 Hindi and 1.37% Santali their first language.

== Economics ==
Balurghat is a distribution centre in northern West Bengal. The main goods traded include rice, jute, sugar cane, fisheries and oilseeds.

== Transport ==
=== Railway ===
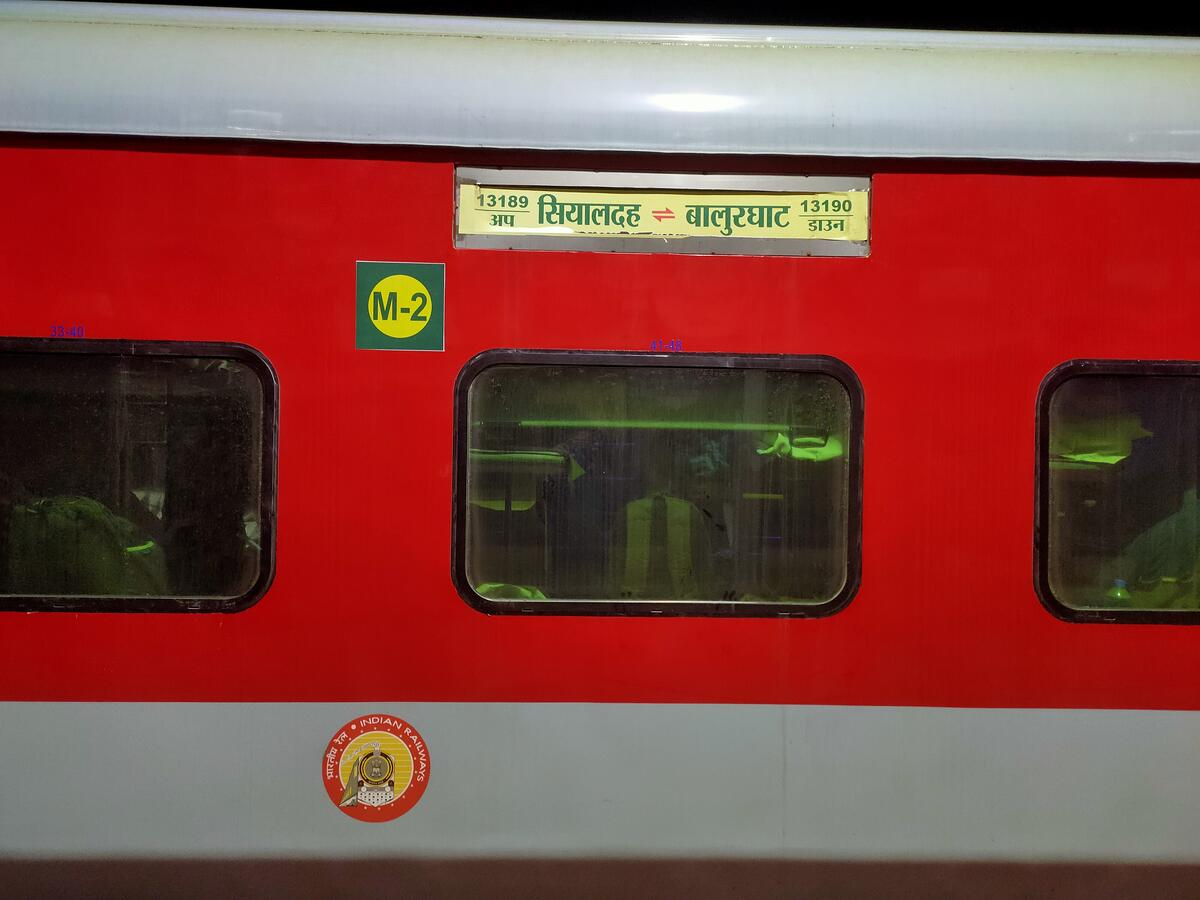
Sealdah Balurghat Express

Balurghat Railway Station is the terminus station of the Eklakhi–Balurghat branch line Trains connecting Balurghat to Kolkata directly include Sealdah-Balurghat express, Tebhaga Express and Howrah-Balurghat Express. Train services also connect Balurghat to Siliguri in the north through Balurghat-Siliguri Intercity Express. Balurghat is also connected to Malda through Balurghat-Malda Court Passenger Train. Besides, Balurghat-Nabadwip Dham Express connects Nabadwip with Balurghat. Since 2024, the Farakka Express is running from Balurghat to New Delhi and upto Bathinda which eventually connect the city with the National Capital Region of India. In 2025, SMVT Bengaluru–Balurghat Express have been started from Balurghat to Bengaluru via Kharagpur, Bhubaneswar and Perambur (near Chennai) which connects the city to South India via the East Coast.

=== Highways ===
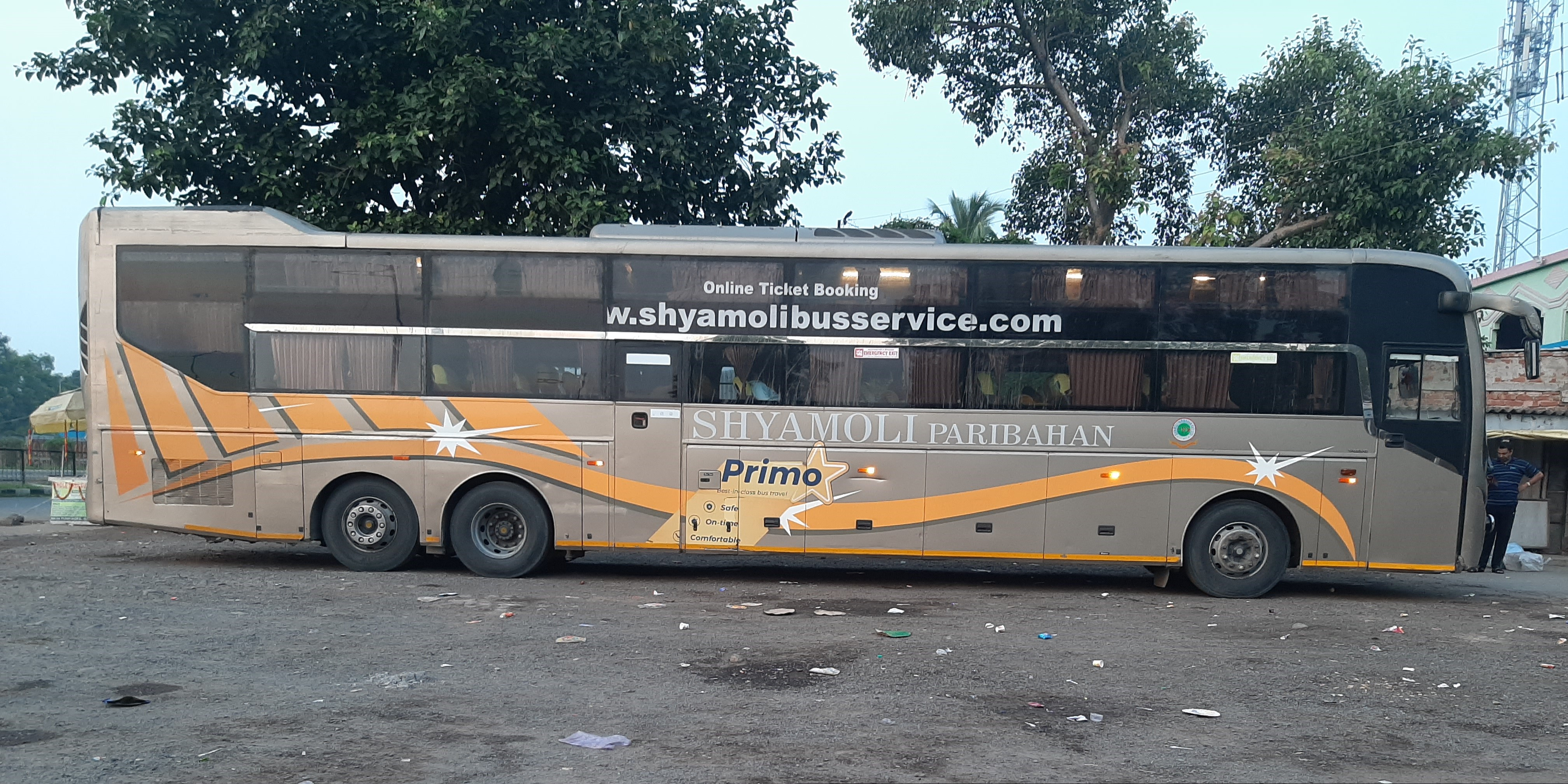
Shyamoli Volvo Kolkata to Balurghat

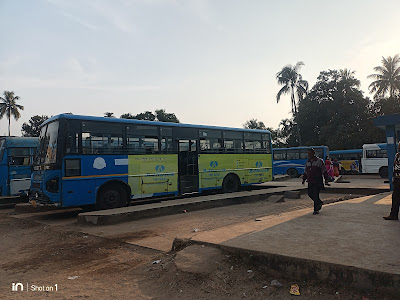
NBSTC Bus stand Balurghat

Indian National Highway 512 passes through Balurghat (from Gazole To Hili).

At Balurghat, there is a Government bus and a separate private bus stand. The NBSTC (Major Service Provider), SBSTC (Limited Service Provider) and WBTC (Only between Kolkata & Balurghat) are the government bus service provides majority of bus rides to distant places. Many buses (both Government and private) run from Balurghat to Kolkata, Siliguri, Jalpaiguri, Coochbehar, Kalna, Durgapur, Malda, and Raiganj.

=== Airways ===
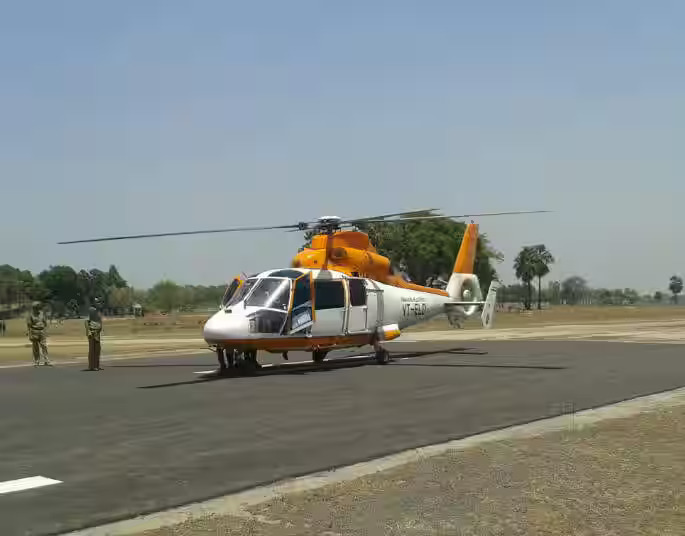
A helicopter landing at Balurghat Airport from Kolkata Airport

Balurghat Airport is situated at the entrance of the town, at Mahinagar, although the airport is not operating right now due to construction and executive issues. A Kolkata-Malda-Balurghat-Coochbehar flight service has been planned for this airport. Previously, there was a Kolkata-Malda-Balurghat helicopter service for some years.

== Education ==
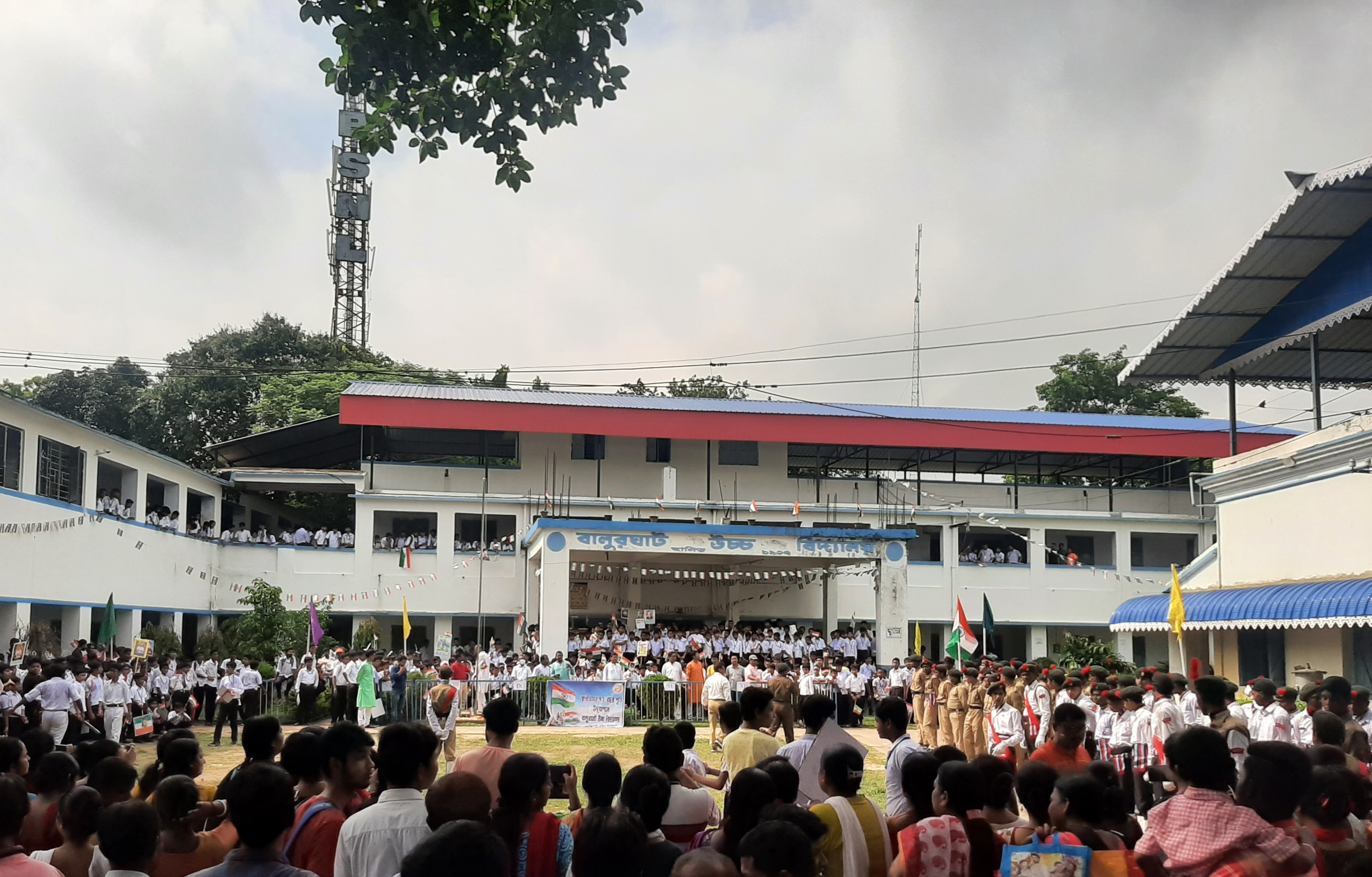
Balurghat High School

Educational Institutions in Balurghat
| Category | Institutions |
| Schools | Balurghat High School; Atreyee D. A. V. Public School; Jawahar Navodaya Vidyalaya, Dakshin Dinajpur |
| Colleges | Balurghat College; Balurghat Mahila Mahavidyalaya; Balurghat Law College; Jamini Majumdar Memorial College |
| Universities | Dakshin Dinajpur University; Uttar Banga Krishi Viswavidyalaya (Majhian Campus) |

== Festivals ==
Durga Puja is widely celebrated throughout the town. The next big festival is Kali Puja which is also a major festival celebrated during Deepawali. Other festivals including Chhath Puja, Rath Yatra, Biswakarma Puja, Ganesh Chaturthi and Saraswati Puja are also widely celebrated at Balurghat. Bolla Kali Puja is celebrated at Bolla approximately 15 kilometres (9 miles) from Balurghat, in November each year, for which millions of devotees come to see the festival. Festivals of non-Hindu religions are also celebrated i.e. Christmas, Ramadaan, and Buddha Purnima.

== Sports ==
Balurghat is also home to district's first stadium to host the top tier national level cricket match like a Ranji Trophy Match. Balurghat Stadium is a multi-purpose stadium used for sports like cricket and football. A major cricket tournament called Bijay Kumar Saha Memorial T-20 Tournament held annually at this stadium where various teams from West Bengal, India & from Bangladesh participate. An indoor sports complex in Balurghat is also inaugurated in 2023 for various indoor sports activities like badminton, table tennis, marshal arts etc. Since 2021, usually in the month of December, the district police have been organising a 10 km marathon, for all age of people, in the town to promote health and traffic rule awareness. The Police line playground is one of the major playground and has the best infrastructure after the main stadium which is used by both the West Bengal Police & general public. Some other major playgrounds are Balurghat College Playground (Uttamasaha), Balurghat High School Playgrounds, Netaji Sporting Club, Railway Station ground etc.

== Healthcare ==
- Dakshin Dinajpur District Hospital has 600 beds
- Balurghat Super Specialty Hospital
- Balurghat Police Hospital has 50 beds
- Balurghat Municipal Hospital or Matri Sadan has 32 beds

== Notable people ==
- Madhubanti Bagchi, singer
- Dhiren Banerjee, Indian Revolutionary & Physician
- Palas Barman, former MP
- Ranen Barman, former MP
- Rasendra Nath Barman, former MP
- Sankar Chakraborty, former MLA
- Susil Ranjan Chattopadhyay, former MP
- Sanjay Hansda, Executive Director of the Reserve Bank of India
- Sukanta Majumdar, Union Minister of State for Education & Union Minister of State for Development of North Eastern Region, Government of India
- Abhijit Mondal, footballer
- Hari Madhab Mukhopadhyay, theatre personality, Padma Shri awardee (posthumously) in 2026

== See also ==
- West Bengal
- Dakshin Dinajpur
- Districts of West Bengal
