= New Farakka Junction railway station =

Railway Station in West Bengal, India

New Farakka Junction
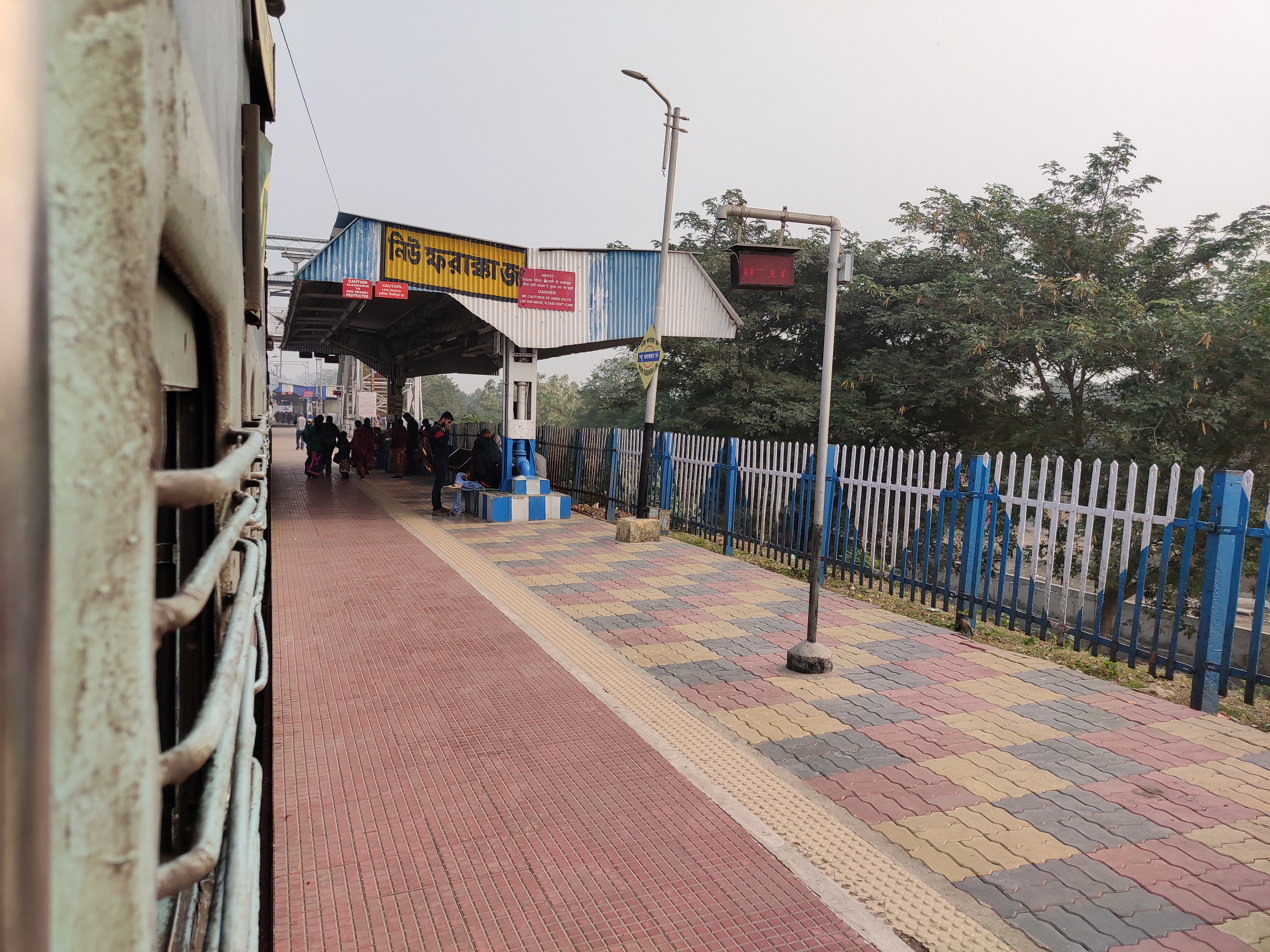
- New Farakka railway station

General information
- Location: Farakka Barrage Township, Murshidabad district, West Bengal; India
- Coordinates: 24°47′42″N 87°54′56″E
- Elevation: 30 m (98 ft)
- System: Indian Railways station Junction station
- Lines: Howrah-NJP Main Line; Howrah-NJP Loop Line; Rampurhat-Malda Town Section; Sahibganj loop
- Platforms: 4
- Tracks: 5

Construction
- Structure type: At grade

Other information
- Status: Functioning
- Station code: NFK
- Zone(s): Eastern Railway
- Division(s): Malda

History
- Opened: 1971
Location
- Location within West Bengal Location within India

New Farakka Junction is a railway station on the Howrah–New Jalpaiguri line and is located in Murshidabad district in the Indian state of West Bengal. New Farakka Junction railway station lies south of the Farakka Barrage.

== Farakka Barrage ==
The 2,240-metre-long (7,350 ft) Farakka Barrage carries a rail-cum-road bridge across the Ganges. The rail bridge was thrown open to the public in 1971, thereby linking the towns of Murshidabad district to Malda, New Jalpaiguri and other railway stations in North Bengal.

== Major trains ==
Number of halting trains: 90

- 27575/27576 Kamakhya–Howrah Vande Bharat Sleeper Express
- 12041/12042 New Jalpaiguri–Howrah Shatabdi Express
- 12516/12517 Silchar-Coimbatore Superfast Express
- 13149/13150 Alipurduar-Sealdah Kanchankanya Express
- 12507/12508 Silchar-Thiruvananthapuram Aronai Superfast Express
- 12513/12514 Silchar–Secunderabad Express
- 12509/12510 Guwahati-Bangaluru Cantt. Kaziranga Superfast Express
- 15929/15930 Dibrugarh–Tambaram Express
- 14055/14056 Kamakhya-Delhi Brahmaputra Mail
- 15629/15630 Tambaram-Silghat Town Nagaon Express
- 15647/15648 Lokmanya Tilak Terminus–Guwahati Express (via Malda Town)
- 15661/15662 Ranchi–Kamakhya Express
- 12345/12346 Guwahati-Howrah Saraighat Superfast Express
- 25657/25658 Sealdah–Silchar Kanchanjunga Express
- 15659/15660 Sealdah–Agartala Kanchanjunga Express
- 15959/15960 Dibrugarh-Howrah Kamrup Express via Guwahati
- 15961/15962 Dibrugarh–Howrah Kamrup Express Via Rangapara North
- 13147/13148 Bamanhat-Sealdah Uttar Banga Express
- 15639/15640 Puri–Kamakhya Express (via Adra)
- 15643/15644 Puri–Kamakhya Express (via Howrah)
- 15619/15620 Kamakhya–Gaya Express
- 13125/13126 Kolkata–Sairang Express
- 13115/13116 Sealdah - Jalpaiguri Road Humsafar Express
- 13141/13142 New Alipurduar-Sealdah Teesta Torsa Express
- 13145/13146 Kolkata–Radhikapur Express
- 13163/13164 Saharsa-Sealdah Hate Bazare Express
- 13159/13160 Kolkata–Jogbani Express
- 13425/13426 Surat–Malda Town Express
- 13011/13012 Howrah–Malda Town Intercity Express
- 13465/13466 Howrah–Malda Town Intercity Express (via Azimganj)
- 13161/13162 Balurghat-Kolkata Tebhaga Express
- 13153/13154 Malda-Kolkata Gour Express
- 13413/13414 Malda-Delhi Farakka Express
- 13483/13484 Farakka Express (via Ayodhya)
- 13415/13416 Malda Town–Patna Express
- 15941/15942 Jhajha–Dibrugarh Weekly Express
- 13421/13422 Nabadwip Dham–Malda Town Express
- 13433/13434 Malda Town-SMVT Bengaluru Amrit Bharat Express
- 13435/13436 Malda Town - Gomti Nagar Amrit Bharat Express
- 14003/14004 Malda Town–New Delhi Express
- 13417/13418 Digha–Malda Town Express
- 13063/13064 Howrah–Balurghat Bi-Weekly Express
- 13409/13410 Malda Town–Jamalpur Intercity Express
- 13033/13034 Katihar–Howrah Express
- 53027/53028 Malda Town–Azimganj Passenger
- 53417/53418 Malda Town–Barddhaman Passenger
- 03427/03428 Malda Town–Haridwar Special Fare Special Express
- 53401/53402 Malda Town–Sahibganj Passenger
