= Malda Town–Kiul Intercity Express =

Train in India

Malda Town-Jamalpur Intercity Express
Overview
- Service type: Express
- First service: 1 July 2005; 20 years ago
- Current operator: Eastern Railway

Route
- Termini: Malda Town; Jamalpur Junction
- Stops: 15
- Distance travelled: 235 km (146 mi)
- Average journey time: 5 hours 57 mins
- Service frequency: Daily
- Train number: 13409 / 13410

On-board services
- Classes: Chair Car, General Unreserved
- Seating arrangements: Yes
- Sleeping arrangements: Yes
- Catering facilities: No
- Observation facilities: Large windows
- Baggage facilities: No
- Other facilities: Below the seats

Technical
- Rolling stock: LHB coach
- Track gauge: 1,676 mm (5 ft 6 in)
- Operating speed: 42 km/h (26 mph) average including halts.

The 13409 / 13410 Malda Town-Jamalpur Junction Intercity Express is an Express express train belonging to Indian Railways Eastern Railway zone that runs between Malda Town and Jamalpur Junction in India.

It operates as train number 13409 from Malda Town to Jamalpur Junction and as train number 13410 in the reverse direction serving the states of West Bengal, Jharkhand & Bihar.

== Coaches ==
The 13409 / 10 Malda Town - Jamalpur Junction Intercity Express has 17 general unreserved and 1 chaircar and 2 EOG coaches . It does not carry a pantry car coach.

As is customary with most train services in India, coach composition may be amended at the discretion of Indian Railways depending on demand.

== Service ==
The 13409 Malda Town - Jamalpur Junction Intercity Express covers the distance of 235 km (146 mi) in 5 hours 30 mins (43 km/h) and in 5 hours 45 mins as the 13410 Jamalpur Junction - Malda Town Intercity Express (41 km/h).

As the average speed of the train is less than 55 km/h (34 mph), as per railway rules, its fare doesn't include a Superfast surcharge.

== Routing ==
The 13409 / 10 Malda Town - Jamalpur Junction Intercity Express runs from Malda Town via Sahebganj, Bhagalpur Junction to Jamalpur Junction.

== Traction ==
As the route is fully electrified, a Howrah Loco Shed based WAP-5 / WAP-7 electric locomotive pulls the train to its destination.
