= Balurghat Airport =

Airport of West Bengal, India

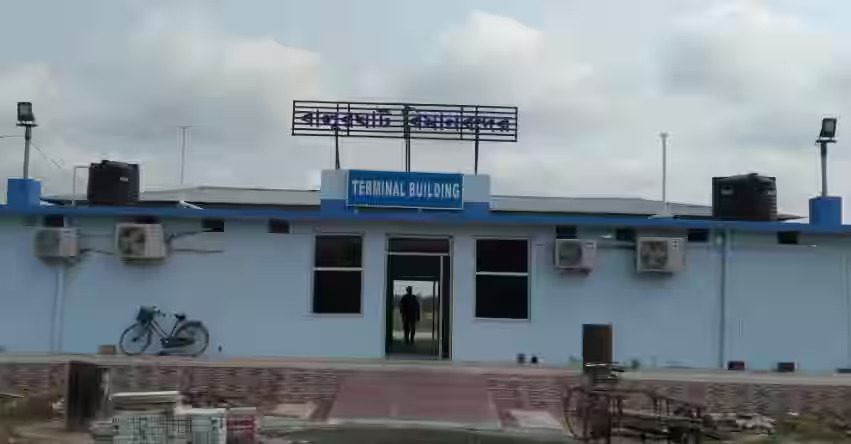
- IATA: RGH; ICAO: VEBG

Summary
- Airport type: Public
- Owner: Airports Authority of India
- Operator: Airports Authority of India
- Location: Balurghat, West Bengal, India
- Elevation AMSL: 78 ft / 24 m
- Coordinates: 25°15′42″N 88°47′44″E

Map
- Location of airport in West Bengal RGH (India)

Runways
Direction	Length		Surface
Direction	ft	m	Surface
09/27	4,906	1,495	Paved

Balurghat Airport (IATA: RGH, ICAO: VEBG) is located 6 km (4 mi) from Balurghat and 34 km (21 mi) away from Gangarampur, a city in West Bengal, India. The airport is currently not in operation.

== History ==
During the World War II, a temporary airport was built by the British Air Force in Balurghat for military needs. In the 1950s, the Surekha Air Service started flying from there until it was stopped during the 1965 India Pakistan war. Finally, in 1984, Vayudoot operated out of the airport. But these flights stopped due to lack of navigation systems, lack of passengers, and financial losses.

== Facilities ==
The airport covers an area of 132.66 acres (53.69 ha) at an elevation of 78 feet (24 m) above mean sea level. It has one runway designated 09/27 with a paved surface measuring 4,906 by 100 feet (1,495 m × 30 m).

== Extension ==
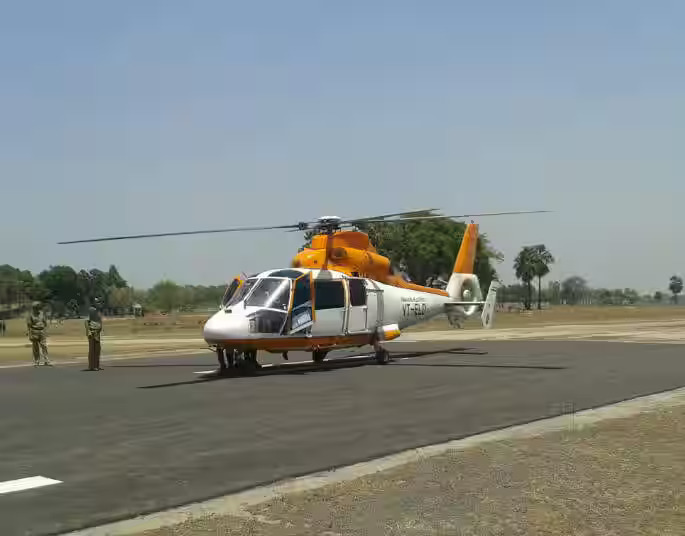
A helicopter landing at Balurghat Airport from Kolkata Airport

The Government of West Bengal had planned to launch air services from the Balurghat Airport in March 2018. The government had allocated around ₹11.35 crores for the up-gradation & extension of the air-strip, passenger lounge, air traffic, restroom of crews and pilots, need-based restaurants, refreshment counters. Airport Authority of India had visited the airport for approvals.

== See also ==
- List of airports by ICAO code: V#VA VE VI VO - India
- List of airports in India
