= Eklakhi–Balurghat branch line =

Railway line in West Bengal, India

Eklakhi-Balurghat branch line
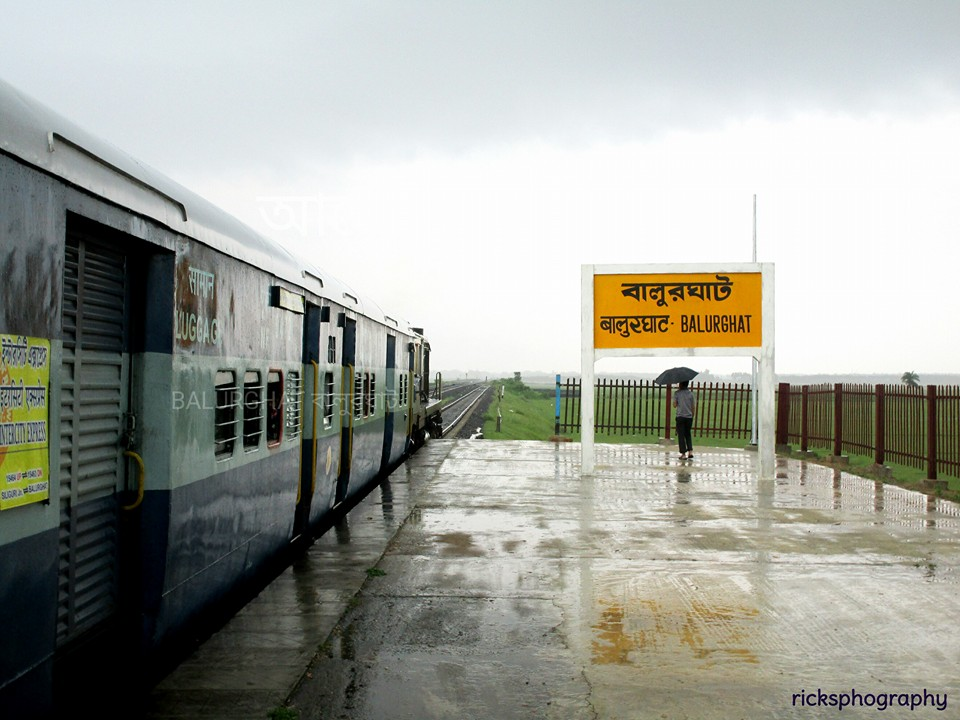
- Balurghat railway station

Overview
- Status: Operation
- Owner: Indian Railways
- Locale: West Bengal
- Termini: Eklakhi; Balurghat
- Stations: 11

Service
- Operator(s): Northeast Frontier Railway zone

History
- Opened: 2004; 21 years ago

Technical
- Line length: 87 km (54 mi)
- Electrification: 2023 with 25 kV AC

Eklakhi–Balurghat branch line is a branch line of the Howrah–New Jalpaiguri line of Indian Railways connecting Balurghat, the district headquarters of Dakshin Dinajpur district with Eklakhi in Malda district of West Bengal.

== History ==
The main line of Eastern Bengal Railway from Sealdah to Siliguri via Ranaghat, Darshana, Santahar, Parbatipur and Haldibari was built in 1878. It passed through Hili in the then unified Dinajpur District.

With the partition of India in 1947, the Chilahati–Parbatipur–Darshana section went to the then East Pakistan. Almost three-fourths of the town of Hili along with the railway station fell inside East Pakistan. The partitioned West Dinajpur district in India had only one connection from Barsoi to Radhikapur near the border. With the partition of this district in 1992, the newly formed Dakshin Dinajpur district lacked any rail connections. To rectify this situation a new line was proposed from Eklakhi in Malda district to the Dakshin Dinajpur district headquarters in Balurghat. This line was completed and opened on 30 December 2004.

=== Proposed Extensions ===
The line from Balurghat has been proposed to be extended right up to Hili town on the Indian side of the Indo-Bangladesh border. A major junction has also been planned to be set up in Itahar and to connect it with Buniadpur & Gazole stations on the Eklakhi–Balurghat line and with Raiganj on the Barsoi–Radhikapur branch line. A new line connecting Buniadpur to Kaliyaganj on the Barsoi–Radhikapur line via Kushmandi is also planned.

== Stations ==
Station code	Station name	Distance (km)
EKl	Eklakhi	0
GZO	Gazole	14
MANG	Mahanagar	20
DOTL	Deotala	25
DLPH	Daulatpur Halt	33
BNDP	Buniadpur	42
GRMP	Gangarampur	55
MLNH	Malancha	64
RMPB	Rampur Bazar	67
MKRH	Mallickpurhat	75
BLGT	Balurghat	87

== Electrification ==
The electrification of this route was started in 2018 and now functioning with 25 kV AC from May 2023.
