= Dhiren Banerjee =

Indian politician

Dr. Dhirendranath Banerjee was an Indian politician and physician. He was a founding member of the Revolutionary Socialist Party (RSP) and an elected parliamentarian.

Banerjee became involved in political struggles during the 1921 Non-Cooperation Movement. He studied at Rajshahi College, where he befriended members of the Anushilan Samiti. He became an active member of the Anushilan Samiti resistance movement in the struggle for Indian independence.

Banerjee graduated from Campbell Medical School in 1928. With a medical diploma, he opened medical practice in the country-side. Whilst working as a physician he remained in touch with Anushilan Samiti. Banerjee was arrested and jailed in 1934.

Banerjee was a founding member of RSP in 1940. He moved to Balurghat and worked on organising RSP in the northern parts of the province. He led the 1956 anti-merger movement in West Dinajpur district (against merger of West Bengal and Bihar). He won the unreserved seat in the Balurghat constituency in the 1957 West Bengal Legislative Assembly election. He was a leading figure in the 1959 Food Movement in West Dinajpur district.

Banerjee died in Balurghat on 8 January 1978, at the age of 74 years.
