= Dakshin Dinajpur University =

Public university in West Bengal, India

- দক্ষিণ দিনাজপুর বিশ্ববিদ্যালয়
- Motto: na hi jñānena sadṛiśhaṁ pavitramiha vidyate (Sanskrit)
- Type: Public State university
- Established: July 31, 2018; 8 years ago
- Affiliations: UGC
- Chancellor: Governor of West Bengal
- Vice-Chancellor: Dr. Pranab Ghosh
- Location: Balurghat, Dakshin Dinajpur district, West Bengal, India
- Campus: 0.0448 km^{2} (11.07 acres)
- Website: www.dduniv.ac.in

Dakshin Dinajpur University is a public state university in Balurghat, Dakshin Dinajpur district, West Bengal. The university was established in 2018. The university is located in Mahinagar, Balurghat.

== History ==
The Dakshin Dinajpur University Act, 2018 was passed in the West Bengal Legislative Assembly on 31 July 2018. After this, the West Bengal government started establishment of the university and construction of the Campus.

Prof. Sanchari Roy Mukherjee joined Dakshin Dinajpur University on December 15, 2020, as first Vice Chancellor. She served her term until March 14, 2023.

In July 2021 Vice Chancellor of university said in press that Dakshin Dinajpur University will start its first session for the students from October 2021.

== Campus ==
Dakshin Dinajpur University has only one campus. The campus is located at Mahinagar, Balurghat. The total area of the campus is 11.07 acres (44,800 m^{2}).

== Courses offered ==
Postgraduate Programs at Dakshin Dinajpur University
Faculty	Degree	Subjects
Arts	Master of Arts (M.A.)	Political Science
Arts	Master of Arts (M.A.)	English
Arts	Upcoming	Bengali, Folklore, Santali
Science	Master of Science (M.Sc.)	Mathematics

== See also ==
- List of universities in West Bengal
- Education in West Bengal
