= Rampur Bazar railway station =

Railway station in West Bengal, India

Rampur Bazar

General information
- Location: Jagadishbati, West Bengal, India
- Coordinates: 25.3446°N 88.6300°E
- Elevation: 33 metres (108 ft)
- System: Indian Railways station
- Owner: Indian Railways
- Line: Eklakhi–Balurghat branch line
- Platforms: 1
- Tracks: 1

Construction
- Structure type: Standard (on ground station)
- Parking: Available

Other information
- Status: Functioning
- Station code: RMPB
- Zone(s): Northeast Frontier Railway
- Division(s): Katihar
- Website: http://www.indianrail.gov.in

History
- Opened: 2004

Services
Preceding station	Indian Railways	Following station
Terminus	Northeast Frontier Railway Eklakhi–Balurghat branch line	Terminus
Location
- Location within West Bengal Location within India

Rampur Bazar railway station is located in Dakshin Dinajpur district in the Indian state of West Bengal. It serves Rampur, Jagadishbati village and the surrounding areas. The station was built in 2004. A few trains, like the Gour Express, Malda Town–Balurghat passenger trains stop at Rampur Bazar station.
