= Gangarampur railway station =

Railway station in West Bengal, India

Gangarampur
- Gangarampur Railway Station

General information
- Location: Gangarampur, West Bengal, India
- Coordinates: 25.3903°N 88.5163°E
- Elevation: 29 metres (95 ft)
- System: Indian Railways station
- Owner: Indian Railways
- Line: Eklakhi–Balurghat branch line
- Platforms: 1
- Tracks: 2

Construction
- Structure type: Standard (on ground station)
- Parking: Available

Other information
- Status: Functioning
- Station code: GRMP
- Zone(s): Northeast Frontier Railway
- Division(s): Katihar
- Website: http://www.indianrail.gov.in

History
- Opened: 30 December 2004
- Rebuilt: under constructed

Services
Preceding station	Indian Railways	Following station
Malancha towards ?	Northeast Frontier Railway Eklakhi–Balurghat branch line	Buniadpur towards ?
Location
- Location within West Bengal Location within India

Gangarampur railway station is located in Dakshin Dinajpur district in the Indian state of West Bengal. It serves Gangarampur city and the surrounding areas. The station was built in 2004, and the first train ran on 30 December 2004. The station is located at the south side of the town, near Gangarampur College. A few express trains, like the Gour Express, Tebhaga Express and Balurghat–Siliguri Intercity Express, Howrah Express, Malda Town passenger, Old Malda passenger, stop at Gangarampur railway station.

== Gangarampur Railway Bridge ==
Trains cross the Gangarampur Railway Bridge over Punarbhaba River near Gangarampur railway station.

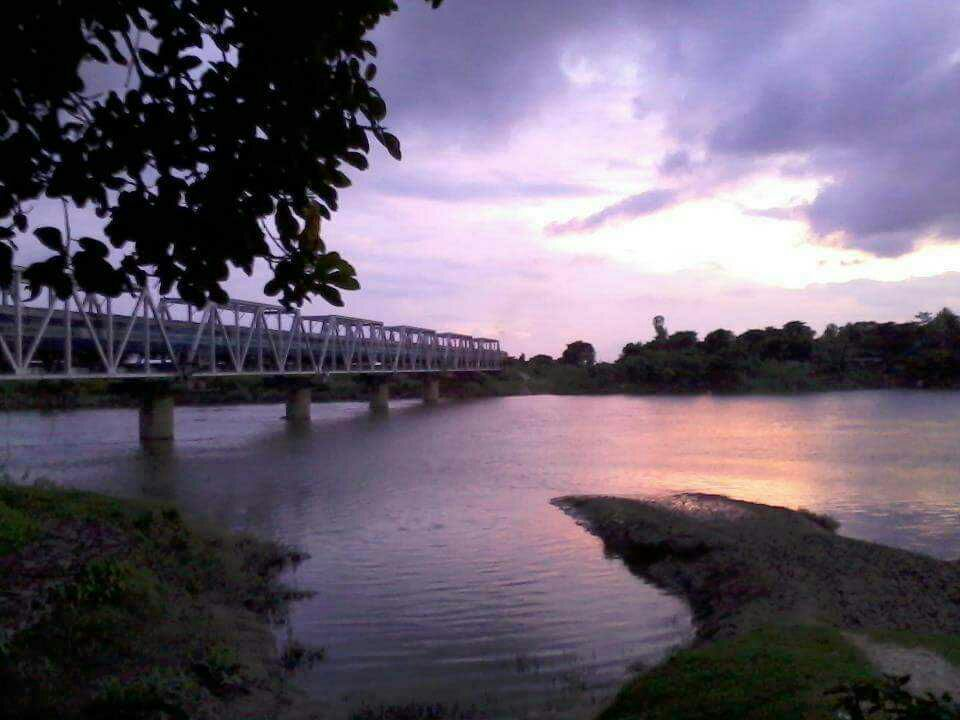
