= Buniadpur railway station =

Railway station in West Bengal, India

Buniadpur

General information
- Location: Buniadpur, West Bengal; India
- Coordinates: 25.3860°N 88.4011°E
- Elevation: 28 metres (92 ft)
- System: Indian Railways station
- Owner: Indian Railways
- Operator: Northeast Frontier Railway
- Line: Eklakhi–Balurghat branch line
- Platforms: 1
- Tracks: 3 in number, 1,676mm (5ft in) "(broad gauge)" in type.
- Connections: Signalling System available.

Construction
- Structure type: Standard (on ground station)
- Parking: Available

Other information
- Status: Functioning
- Station code: BNDP
- Zone(s): Northeast Frontier Railway
- Division(s): Katihar
- Website: http://www.indianrail.gov.in

History
- Opened: 30 December 2004
- Rebuilt: 2007
- Electrified: Single diesel line

Services
Preceding station	Indian Railways	Following station
Gangarampur towards ?	Northeast Frontier Railway zone Eklakhi–Balurghat branch line	Daulatpur Halt towards ?
Location
- Location within West Bengal Location within India

Buniadpur railway station is a railway station of Buniadpur city located in Dakshin Dinajpur district in the state of West Bengal, India. Part of Northeast Frontier Railway zone, the station serves Buniadpur city and the surrounding areas.

== History ==
In 2004, when a broad-gauge railway track was being constructed from Eklakhi to Balurghat (Proposed to be extended up to Hilli), a radical change was seen in the transport system of Dakshin Dinajpur, as then State Highway 10 was the only way to connect other important locations.

The new Railway line gave an opportunity to the people of the Buniadpur to link to Kolkata by trains. The first train connected the station on 30 December 2004.

== Trains ==
Buniadpur is an important railway station, next after Balurghat. It is the halt of 4 Express trains and terminal of a Passenger Train.
