= Balurghat railway station =

Railway station in West Bengal, India

Balurghat
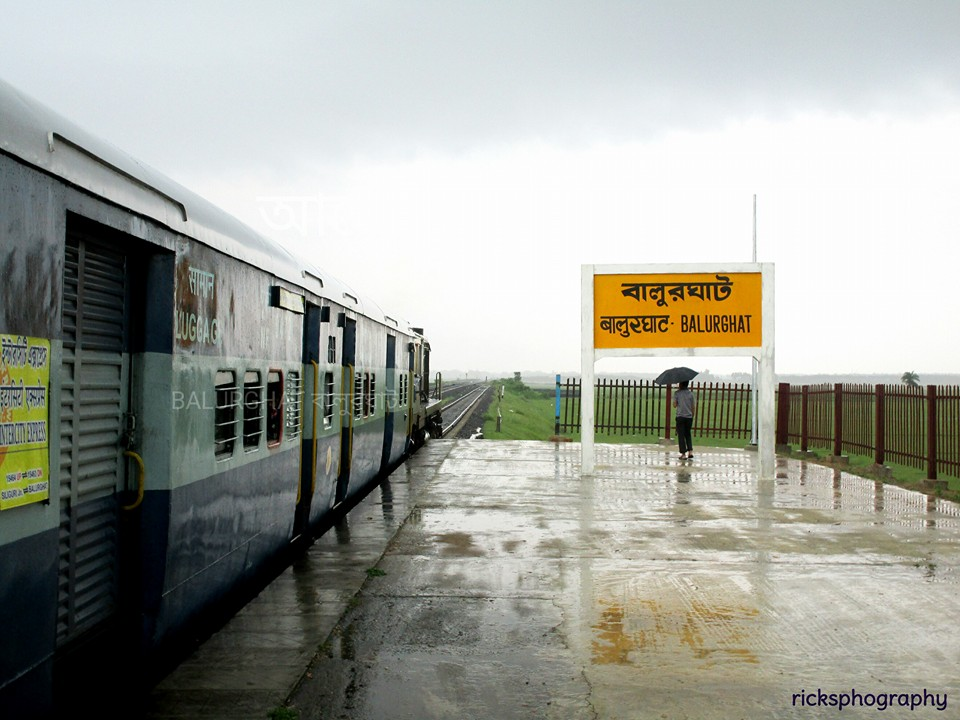
- Balurghat Railway Station

General information
- Location: Balurghat, Dakshin Dinajpur, West Bengal; India
- Coordinates: 25°13′59″N 88°45′28″E
- Elevation: 24 metres (79 ft)
- System: NSG-4 Indian Railways Station
- Owner: Indian Railways
- Operator: Northeast Frontier Railway
- Line: Eklakhi–Balurghat branch line
- Platforms: 3
- Tracks: 5

Construction
- Structure type: Standard (on-ground station)
- Parking: Available
- Cycle facilities: Available
- Accessible: Yes

Other information
- Status: Active
- Station code: BLGT
- Zone(s): Northeast Frontier Railway zone
- Division(s): Katihar

History
- Opened: 2004; 22 years ago
- Rebuilt: Under Construction Under Amrit Bharat Station Scheme
- Electrified: 2023; 3 years ago

Passengers
- 10,000 daily

Services
Preceding station	Indian Railways	Following station
Terminus	Northeast Frontier Railway zone Eklakhi–Balurghat branch line	Mallickpurhat towards Gangarampur
Location
- Location within West Bengal Location within India

Balurghat railway station (station code: BLGT) is a railway station on the Eklakhi–Balurghat branch line and is located in Dakshin Dinajpur district in the Indian state of West Bengal. It serves Balurghat city and the surrounding areas. Train services such as the Balurghat-Kolkata Tebhaga express and the Sealdah-Balurghat express connect the town of Balurghat with the state capital Kolkata, while passenger trains like Balurghat–Siliguri Intercity Express connect the town with North Bengal's important metropolis Siliguri. A new feather added in the crown of Balurghat as it gets new train SMVT Bengaluru–Balurghat Weekly Express to connect the city or District with the southern part of India. Also trains like Balurghat - Bathinda Farakka Express are available from this station.

== Eklakhi–Balurghat line ==
The 87.26-kilometre (54.22 mi) long Eklakhi–Balurghat branch line was opened in 2004. The extension of the Eklakhi–Balurghat branch line to Hili was announced in the Rail Budget for 2010–11. Initial work for the 29.6 km (18.4 mi) Balurghat-Hili railway line has been taken up by Northeast Frontier Railway. In the initial stages major expenditure is anticipated for land acquisition. The estimates are around Rs. 300 crores. 166.281 ha (410.89 acres) of land is required to be acquired. District Magistrate, Dakshin Dinajpur is also involved in the process.

== Services ==
The following Train services are available from this station:

Train No.	Train Name	Origin & Destination	Departure (IST)	Arrival (IST)	Running Days
UP
13161	Tebhaga Express	Kolkata – Balurghat	12:55	22:00	M T W T F S
13189	Balurghat-Sealdah Express	Sealdah – Balurghat	22:00	08:30	M T W T F S S
13431	Nabadwip Dham - Balurghat Express	Nabadwip Dham – Balurghat	05:20	11:40	T W F S S
15733	Farakka Express (via Sultanpur)	Balurghat – Sultanpur – Bathinda	17:00	11:50	M T S
15743	Farakka Express (via Ayodhya Cantt)	Balurghat – Ayodhya Cantt – Bathinda	17:00	11:50	S T W F
15463	Balurghat-Siliguri Intercity Express	Balurghat – Siliguri	12:15	19:10	M T W T F S S
13063	Howrah–Balurghat Express	Howrah – Balurghat	07:50	17:45	M T W T F
16523	SMVT Bengaluru–Balurghat Weekly Express	SMVT Bengaluru – Balurghat	10:15	04:15	W
55421	Balurghat-Malda Town Passenger	Malda Town – Balurghat	07:00	09:30	M T W T F S S
DOWN
13162	Tebhaga Express	Balurghat – Kolkata	05:45	14:15	M T W T F S
13190	Balurghat-Sealdah Express	Balurghat – Sealdah	19:00	04:25	M T W T F S S
13432	Balurghat Nabadwip Dham Express	Balurghat - Nabadwip Dham	14:30	21:15	T W F S S
15734	Farakka Express (via Sultanpur)	Bathinda – Sultanpur – Balurghat	15:00	12:55	M T S
15744	Farakka Express (via Ayodhya Cantt)	Bathinda – Ayodhya Cantt – Balurghat	15:00	12:55	S T W F
15464	Balurghat-Siliguri Intercity Express	Siliguri – Balurghat	07:30	15:15	M T W T F S S
13064	Howrah–Balurghat Express	Balurghat – Howrah	20:45	05:30	M T W T F
16524	SMVT Bengaluru–Balurghat Weekly Express	Balurghat – SMVT Bengaluru	05:15	03:00	S
55422	Balurghat Malda Town Passenger	Balurghat – Malda Town	18:00	20:50	M T W T F S S
