= Gour Express =

Train in India

Sealdah Junction - Malda Town Gour Express
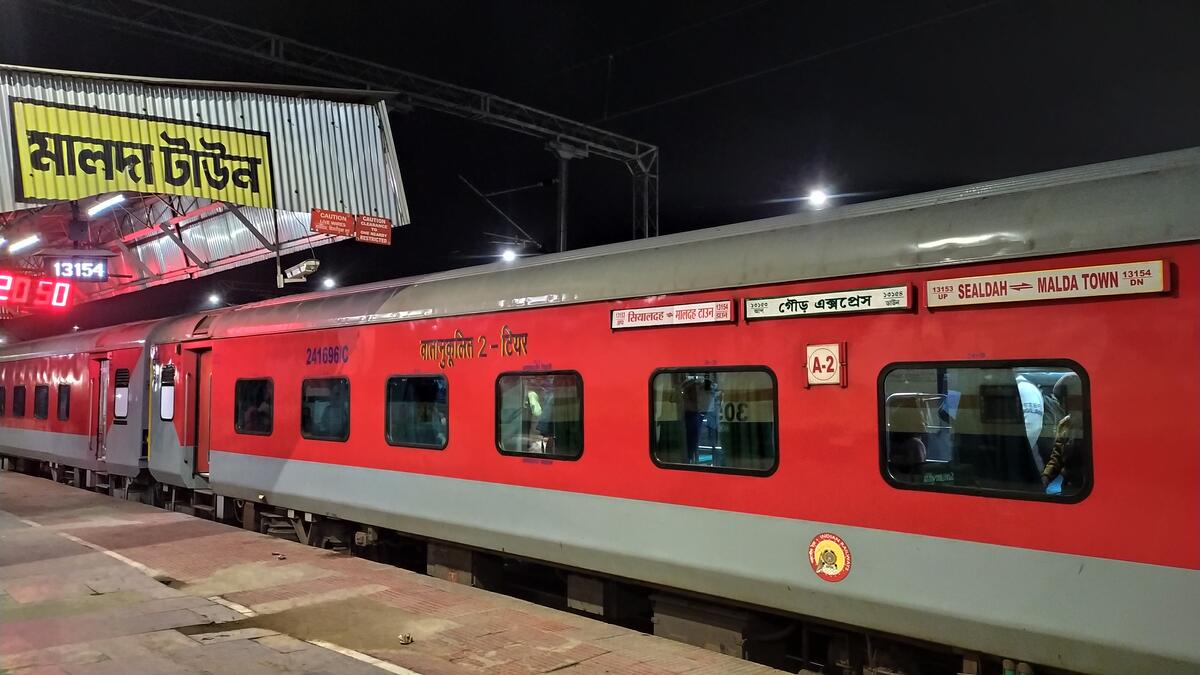
- 13153/Gour Express (PT) - Sealdah to Maldah Town ER/Eastern Zone

Overview
- Service type: Express
- Locale: West Bengal & Jharkhand
- First service: April 1980, 20; 46 years ago
- Current operator: Eastern Railway

Route
- Termini: Sealdah (SDAH); Malda Town (MLDT)
- Stops: 12
- Distance travelled: 349 km (217 mi)
- Average journey time: 8 hours in up direction, 7 hours 15 minutes in down direction.
- Service frequency: Daily
- Train number: 13153/13154 (to Malda Town)

On-board services
- Classes: First AC, Second AC, Third AC, Sleeper, Unreserved
- Seating arrangements: Available
- Sleeping arrangements: Available
- Auto-rack arrangements: Available
- Observation facilities: Large windows
- Baggage facilities: Available

Technical
- Rolling stock: LHB coach
- Track gauge: 1,676 mm (5 ft 6 in)
- Operating speed: 44 km/h (27 mph) average with halts

Gour Express is an express train of the Indian Railways connecting the district of Kolkata with the district of Malda. The train covers a distance of 347.3 km (216 mi) up to Malda and back to Sealdah, Kolkata with the numbers 13153/54.

== Timeline ==
The Gour Express commenced operations as a triweekly express service between Sealdah and Malda from 20 April 1980. The train proved successful and the then railway minister A. B. A. Ghani Khan Choudhury played a key role in increasing the frequency of the service. On 2 October 1982, he flagged off the first run of the train as a daily service.

== Important stoppages ==
- Sealdah
- Naihati Junction
- Bandel Junction
- Barddhaman Junction
- Bolpur Shantiniketan
- Ahmadpur Junction
- Sainthia Junction
- Rampurhat Junction
- Nalhati Junction
- Murarai
- Rajgram (only for 13154 service)
- Pakur
- New Farakka Junction
- Malda Town

Note: Bold letters indicates Major Railway Stations/Major Cities.

== Routeing and halts ==
Station code	Station name	13153		Distance from source in km	Day	13154		Distance from source in km	Day
Station code	Station name	Arrival	Departure	Distance from source in km	Day	Arrival	Departure	Distance from source in km	Day
SDAH	Sealdah	Source	22:05	0	1	04:40	Destination	347.3	2
NH	Naihati Junction	22:50	22:53	38.1	1	03:34	03:36	309.2	2
BDC	Bandel Junction	23:30	23:35	46.5	1	02:46	02:50	300.2	2
BWN	Barddhaman Junction	00:50	00:55	113.9	2	01:41	01:46	233.4	2
BHP	Bolpur Shantiniketan	01:42	01:44	165.3	2	00:41	00:43	182	2
RPH	Rampurhat Junction	02:57	03:02	225.8	2	00:01	00:06	121.5	2
NHT	Nalhati Junction	03:15	03:17	239.9	2	23:34	23:36	107.3	1
MRR	Murarai	03:32	03:34	256.0	2	23:18	23:19	91.2	1
RJG	Rajgram	---	---	267.7	2	23:02	23:03	79.5	1
PKR	Pakur	03:56	03:58	279:2	2	22:46	22:48	68	1
NFK	New Farakka Junction	04:48	04:53	312.7	2	21:47	21:52	34.6	1
MLDT	Malda Town	6:05	Destination	347.3	2	Source	21:25	0	1

== Timings ==
1. 13153 leaves Sealdah around 22:05 everyday and reaches Malda Town at 6:05 next day.
2. 13154 departs Malda Town around 21:25 everyday and reaches Sealdah at 4:40 next day.

== Coach composition ==
The train consists of 21 passenger coaches. The train runs with the following coach composition -

- 1 Composite 1st A/C
- 3 A/C 2-tier coaches
- 2 A/C 3-tier coaches
- 9 Non-A/C sleeper coaches
- 4 Unreserved sleeper coaches (UR)
- 1 Luggage-cum-Guard coaches with unreserved seating (SLR)
- 1 End on Generation (EOG)

Of these, one Luggage-cum-Guard, one unreserved sleeper, three reserved non-A/C sleeper, one A/C 3-tier and one A/C 2-tier coach were used for the through service between Sealdah and Balurghat (now closed).

== Traction ==
As the route from Sealdah to Malda is fully electrified, it is hauled by a Howrah/Sealdah-based WAP-4/WAP-7 throughout its entire journey.

== See also ==
- Old Malda Junction
- Sealdah railway station
- Malda Town railway station
- Gangarampur railway station
- Balurghat railway station
