= Gazole railway station =

Railway station in West Bengal, India

General information
- Location: Station Road, Gazole Town, West Bengal; India
- Coordinates: 25.2247°N 88.1982°E
- Elevation: 40 m (130 ft)
- System: Indian Railways
- Line: Eklakhi–Balurghat branch line
- Platforms: 2

Construction
- Structure type: Standard (on ground)
- Parking: Available

Other information
- Station code: GZO
- Zone(s): Northeast Frontier Railway
- Division(s): Katihar
Location
- Location within West Bengal Location within India

Gazole railway station is a station on the Eklakhi–Balurghat branch line in West Bengal, India. This railway station of the North East Frontier Railways is situated at Gazole Town, Malda district. The statiion code is GZO.

From March 2026, the Farakka Express is given a stop at Gazole station.
