= Eklakhi Junction railway station =

Railway Station in West Bengal, India

Eklakhi Junction

General information
- Location: Eklakhi, Maldah, West Bengal; India
- Coordinates: 25°10′04″N 88°05′59″E
- Elevation: 33 metres (108 ft)
- System: Indian Railway Junction station
- Owner: Indian Railways
- Operator: Northeast Frontier Railway
- Lines: Howrah–New Jalpaiguri line, Eklakhi–Balurghat branch line
- Platforms: 3

Construction
- Structure type: Standard (on ground station)

Other information
- Status: Functioning
- Station code: EKI
- Zone(s): Northeast Frontier Railway
- Division(s): Katihar

History
- Opened: 1971?
Location
- Location within West Bengal Location within India

Eklakhi Junction railway station (station code:- EKI) is a railway station on the Howrah–New Jalpaiguri line and it is located in Maldah district in the Indian state of West Bengal. The Eklakhi–Balurghat branch line connects Balurghat to the trunk line.

== Eklakhi–Balurghat line ==
The 87.26 km (54.22 mi) long Eklakhi–Balurghat branch line was opened in 2004. Extension of the Eklakhi–Balurghat branch line to Hili was announced in the Rail Budget for 2010–11.

Preceding station	Indian Railways	Following station
Adina towards ?	Northeast Frontier Railway zone Howrah–New Jalpaiguri line	Kumarganj towards ?
Terminus	Northeast Frontier Railway zone Eklakhi–Balurghat branch line	Gazole towards ?
