= Malda Town railway station =

Railway Station in West Bengal, India

Malda Town
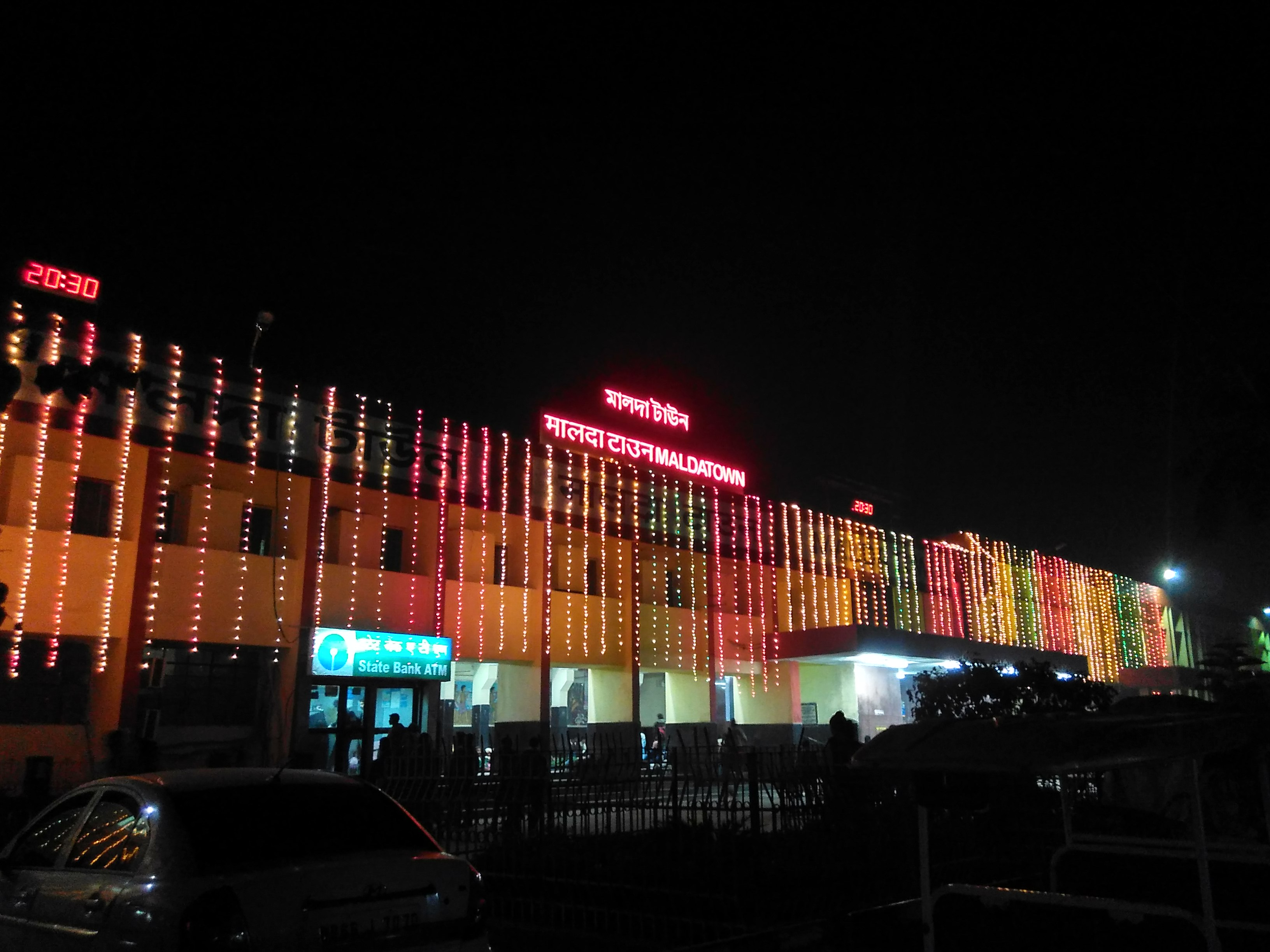
- Malda Town Railway Station at night

General information
- Location: A. B. A. Ghani Khan Choudhury Sarani, English Bazar, Malda district, West Bengal; India
- Coordinates: 25°00′58″N 88°07′49″E
- Elevation: 30 metres (98 ft)
- System: Indian Railways station
- Owner: Indian Railways
- Operator: Eastern Railway
- Line: Howrah–New Jalpaiguri line
- Platforms: 7
- Tracks: 26

Construction
- Structure type: At-grade
- Parking: Available

Other information
- Status: Active
- Station code: MLDT
- Zone(s): Eastern Railway
- Division(s): Malda

History
- Opened: 1959; 67 years ago

Services
Preceding station	Indian Railways	Following station
Gour Malda towards Howrah Junction	Eastern Railway zone Howrah–New Jalpaiguri line	Old Malda Junction towards New Jalpaiguri Junction
Location
- Location within West Bengal Location within India
- Interactive map

Malda Town Railway Station is a railway station on the Howrah–New Jalpaiguri line under Malda railway division of Eastern Railway zone. It serves the city of Malda in the Indian state of West Bengal. One of the first two Amrit Bharat Express trains originating from this station towards SMVT Bengaluru station was flagged off on 30 December 2023. It is the 89th out of the top 100 railway stations of India in terms of revenue.

== History ==
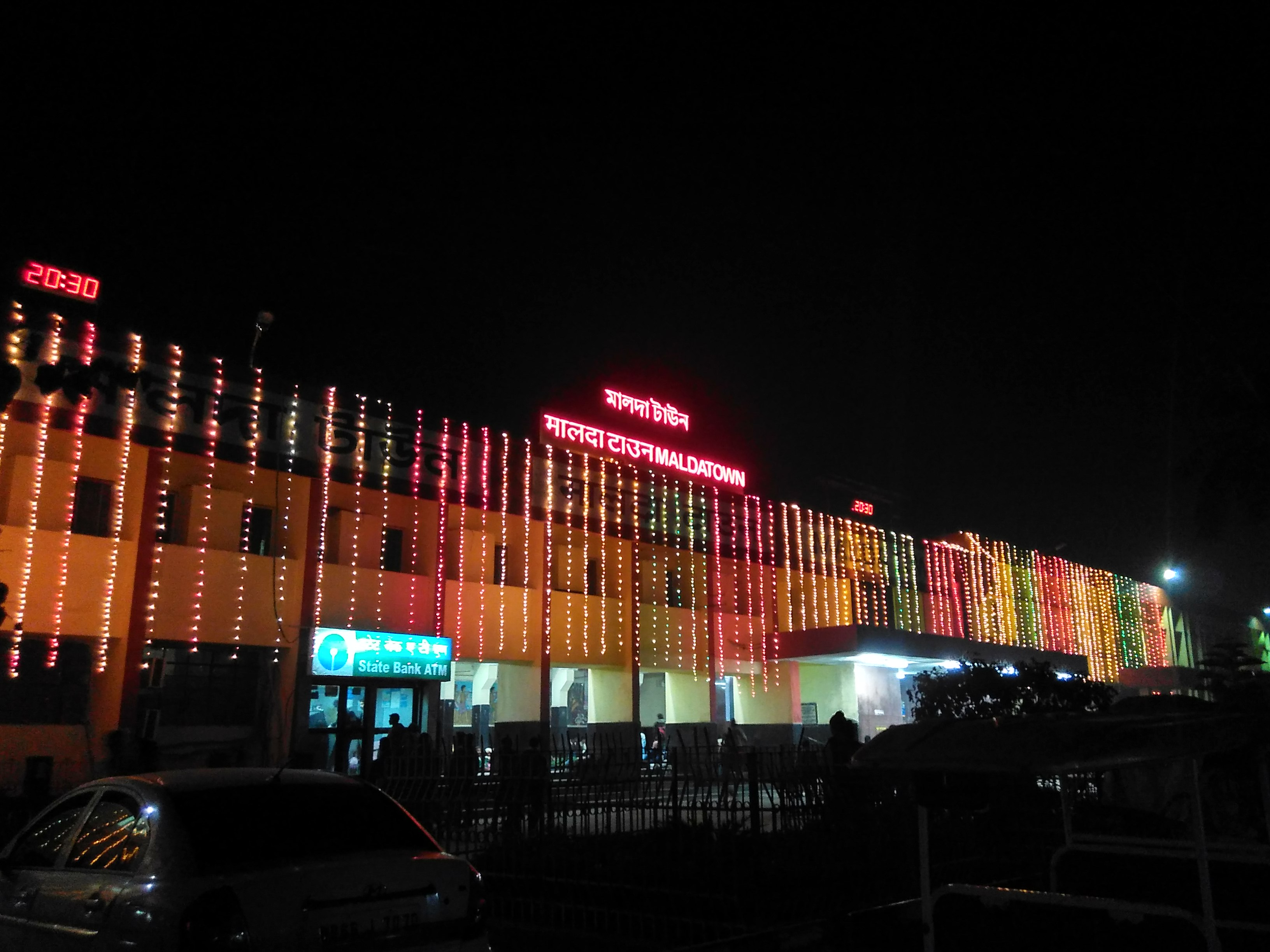
Malda Town railway station at night

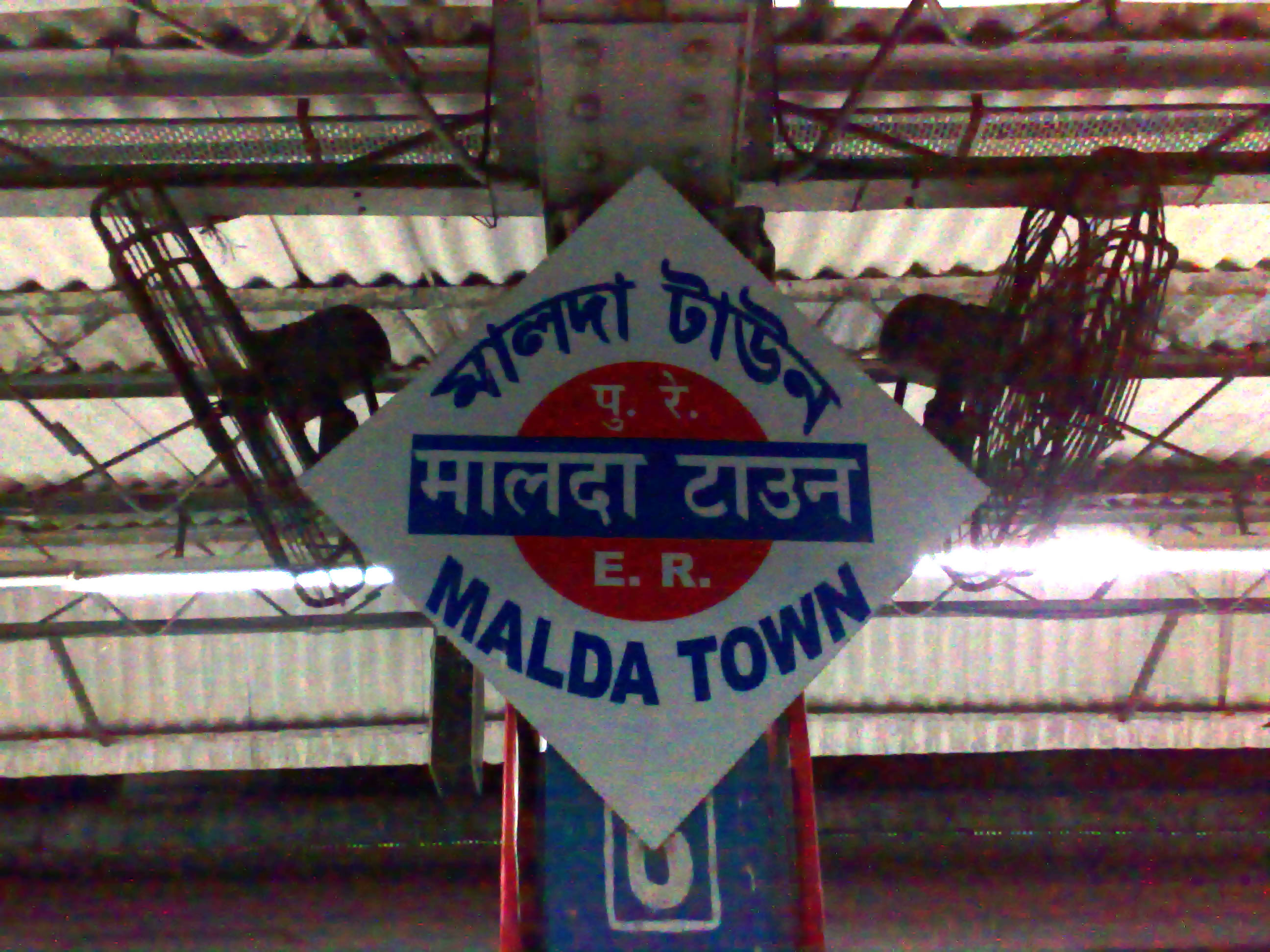
Station name plate

In the early 1960s, when Farakka Barrage was being constructed, a radical change was made in the railway system north of the Ganges. Indian Railways created a new broad-gauge rail link from Kolkata.

The 2,240 m (7,350 ft) long Farakka Barrage carries a rail-cum-road bridge across the Ganges. The rail bridge was opened in 1971 thereby linking the Barharwa–Azimganj–Katwa loop to Malda, New Jalpaiguri and other railway stations in North Bengal.

=== Busy station ===
Malda Town railway station is amongst the top hundred booking stations of Indian Railways. One of the reasons for it being a busy station is that every train that passes through the station stops here since it is the meeting point of two railway zones (the Eastern Railway and the Northeast Frontier Railway). To the north of the station starts the Northeast Frontier Railway, and to the south of it starts the Eastern Railway.

== Malda railway division ==
Malda railway division is one of the four railway divisions under the Eastern Railway zone of Indian Railways. This railway division was formed in 1984 and its headquarters is located at Malda in the state of West Bengal, India. There are two A-1 stations under Malda railway division, Malda Town railway station and Bhagalpur railway station

== Diesel Loco Shed, Malda Town ==
Malda Diesel Shed was established in 1984. This shed comes under the jurisdiction of the Northeast Frontier Railway zone, even though Malda Town comes under the Eastern Railway zone.

Serial no.	Locomotive class	Horsepower	Quantity
1.	WDM-3D	3300	11
2.	WAG-9	6120	167
Total locomotives active as of February 2026			178

== Amenities ==
The major facilities available are waiting rooms, retiring rooms, computerised reservation facility, reservation counter, and vehicle parking. The vehicles are allowed to enter the station premises. There are vegetarian and non-vegetarian refreshment rooms, tea stalls, book stalls, post and telegraphic office and Government Railway Police (G.R.P.) office. Automatic ticket vending machines are installed to reduce the queue for train tickets on the station. This station is being redeveloped under the Amrit Bharat Station Scheme.

== Platforms ==
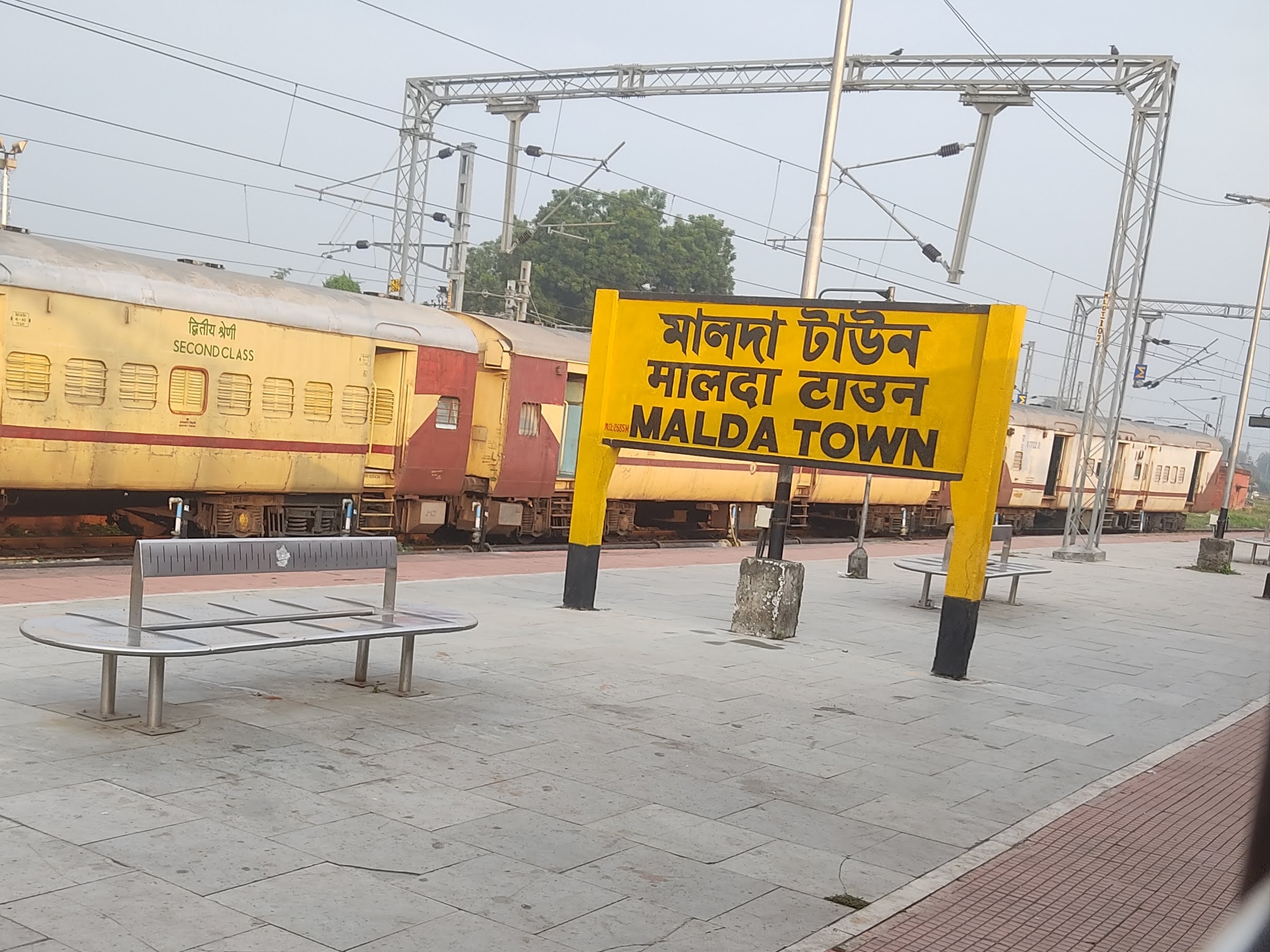
Malda Town railway station

There are seven platforms in Malda Town railway station. They are interconnected with three foot overbridges. Escalators are installed at each of the platforms. There are twenty-five lines, of which seven are along platforms, whereas the rest are loop lines.

== Tourism ==
The ruins of the historic cities of Gour and Pandua can be visited from the proximity of Malda Town railway station.
