= Sihal =

Village in West Bengal

- Village
- Location within West Bengal Location within India
- Coordinates: 25°28′51.28″N 88°27′4.96″E
- Country: India
- State: West Bengal
- District: Dakshin Dinajpur

Area
  - Total: 0.8176 km^{2} (0.3157 sq mi)

Population (2011)
  - Total: 1,001
  - Male: 507
  - Female: 494

Muslims = 60% ▲ Hindus = 40% Others (Christian, Sikh, Buddhists) = 0%

Languages
  - Official: Bengali, English
- Time zone: UTC+5:30 (IST)
- PIN: 733121
- Telephone Code: 03524
- Vehicle registration: WB
- Climate: Moderate, Comfortable (Köppen)
- Lok Sabha constituency: Balurghat
- Nearest city: Buniadpur
- Website: ddinajpur.nic.in

Sihal is a village located in Bansihari subdivision of Dakshin Dinajpur district in West Bengal, India.

== Location ==
It is situated 13.1 km (8.1 mi) from sub-district headquarters Buniadpur. Balurghat is the district headquarters of this village. Ellahabad gram panchayat is the gram panchayat of this village. The total geographical area of the village is 81.76 hectares (202.0 acres; 0.8176 km^{2}). The village code of this village is 311756.

== Population ==
With about 247 houses, this village has a total population of 1,001 people amongst them are 507 male and 494 female and a total geographical area of 81.76 hectares (202.0 acres) or 0.8176 km^{2}. The literacy rate of the total population of this village is 67.53% among 70.22% males and 64.78% females are literate.

== See also ==
- Mirzadpur village in Dakshin Dinajpur.
- Bejebikair village in Dakshin Dinajpur.
