= Balurghat College =

Educational institution in West Bengal, India

- বালুরঘাট মহাবিদ্যালয়
- Type: Public college
- Established: 1948; 78 years ago
- Academic affiliations: University of Gour Banga
- President: Arpita Ghosh
- Principal: Pankaj Kundu
- Students: Approx. 7,500+
- Undergraduates: Yes
- Postgraduates: Yes
- Doctoral students: No
- Location: College More, Balurghat, West Bengal, 733101, India; 25.2299532°N 88.7777773°E
- Campus: Urban
- Language: Bengali, English
- Website: balurghatcollege.ac.in
- Location in West Bengal Balurghat College (India)

Balurghat College is a co-educational institution of higher education located in Balurghat, Dakshin Dinajpur district, West Bengal, India.

== History ==
The college was established in June 1948 as an intermediate liberal arts college with 96 students. In 1950, the college was recognized by the University Grants Commission and it is supported by the West Bengal government as an aided college. North Bengal University accepted the college as a constituent college in September 2003; it is now under Gour Banga University.

== About college ==
Today, the college has grown into a degree college with over 3,000 students, with undergraduate education in arts, sciences and commerce, and postgraduate courses in Bengali and commerce.

Distance education is offered through North Bengal University, and the college is a study centre for Netaji Subhas Open University and Indira Gandhi National Open University.

English and Bengali are compulsory languages for all undergraduate students at Balurghat College.

== Academics ==
Subjects Categorized by Faculty
| Faculty | Subjects |
| Arts | Bengali; English; Sanskrit; History; Economics; Education; Geography; Philosophy; Political Science; Journalism and Mass Communication |
| Science | Chemistry; Mathematics; Physics; Computer Science; Botany; Zoology; Geography; Physical Education; Bio-Science; Pure Science; Food & Nutrition |
| Commerce | Accountancy; Commerce |

== Accreditation ==
Balurghat College was accredited by the National Assessment and Accreditation Council (NAAC) in May 2004 with a grade of "B". In the 2nd Cycle, in February 2021, College is accredited with Grade B by NAAC in the new metrics based assessment system.

== Campus ==
The campus occupies 9.5 acres (38,000 m^{2}) in Balurghat and is equipped with facilities including a library, laboratories, museum, hostel, workshop and guest house.

== Museum ==
Balurghat College Museum is a new addition to the campus, with an extensive collection of early stone sculptures of the Pala-Sena period, coins and 11th century stone inscriptions of Nayapala from the town of Gangarampur.

== Notable professor ==
- Hari Madhab Mukhopadhyay, theatre personality

== Notable alumni ==
- Toraf Hossain Mandal (born 1959), social worker and politician
- Mafuja Khatun (born 1970), politician

== See also ==
- List of institutions of higher education in West Bengal
- Education in India
- Education in West Bengal
