= Jatindra Nath Pramanick =

Indian politician

Member of Parliament, Lok Sabha
- In office 1967-1971
- Preceded by: Sarkar Murmu
- Succeeded by: Rasendra Nath Barman
- Constituency: Balurghat, West Bengal

Personal details
- Born: February 1, 1907 Dhamja, P.O. Fatehpurhat, Bengal Presidency, British India
- Party: Indian National Congress
- Spouse: Sarada Mayee Pramanik

Jatindra Nath Pramanick was an Indian politician. He was elected to the Lok Sabha, lower house of the Parliament of India from Balurghat, West Bengal as a member of the Indian National Congress.
