= Goutam Das =

Indian politician

Member of the West Bengal Legislative Assembly
- In office 2016–2021
- Preceded by: Satyendra Nath Ray
- Succeeded by: Satyendra Nath Ray
- Constituency: Gangarampur

Personal details
- Born: 1974 (age 51–52) West Bengal, India
- Party: Indian National Congress Trinamool Congress
- Profession: Politician

Goutam Das (born 1974) is an Indian politician from West Bengal. He is a former member of the West Bengal Legislative Assembly from Gangarampur Assembly constituency, which is reserved for Scheduled Caste community, in Dakshin Dinajpur district. He was elected in the 2016 West Bengal Legislative Assembly election representing the Indian National Congress.

== Early life and education ==
Das is from Gangarampur, Dakshin Dinajpur district, West Bengal. He is the son of late Gopendra Das. He completed his BA in 1997 at Gangarampur College, which is affiliated with University of North Bengal. He is into cultivation while his wife is a primary school teacher.

== Career ==
Das was first elected as an MLA from Gangarampur Assembly constituency representing the Indian National Congress in the 2016 West Bengal Legislative Assembly election. He polled 80,401 votes and defeated his nearest rival, Satyendra Nath Roy of the All India Trinamool Congress, by a margin of 10,733 votes. Later, he shifted to the Trinamool Congress while Roy joined the Bharatiya Janata Party. Contesting on Trinamool ticket, Das lost the 2021 West Bengal Legislative Assembly election to Satyendra Nath Ray, who contested this election on the Bharatiya Janata Party ticket, by a margin of 4,592 votes.
