= Chakbhabani Kalibari =

Building in India

Coordinates: 25°13′46.66″N 88°46′22.52″E

Chakbhabani Kalibari is an historic temple at Balurghat in the West Bengal State of India.

The temple is close to Balurghat Girl's High School, Balurghat Jail, Administrative Office, Municipal Office and Balurghat College.
