= Tista Das =

Indian actress

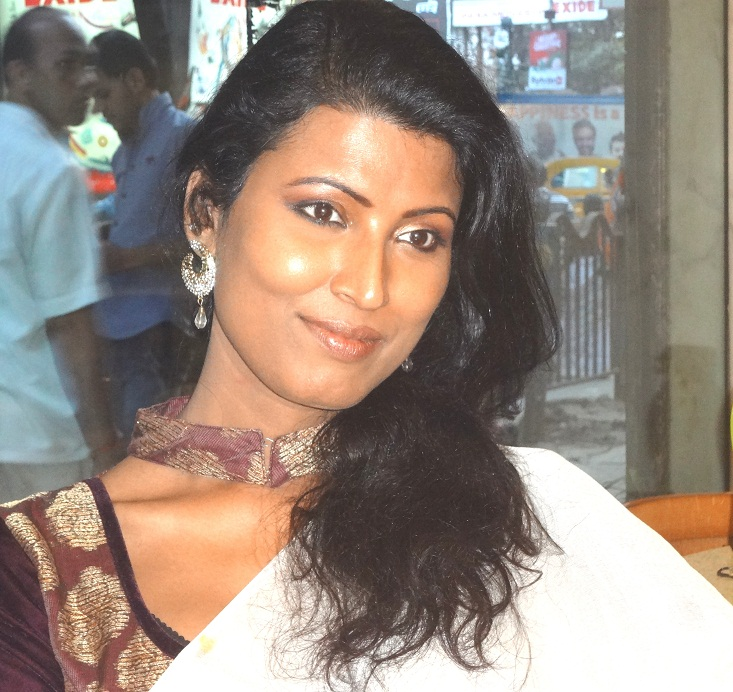
- Tista Das in 2018
- Born: 9 May 1978 (age 47); Agarpara, West Bengal, India
- Other names: Tista Mitra

Tista Das (Bengali: তিস্তা দাস) or Teesta Das (born 9 May 1978) is an Indian transgender rights activist, actress and writer from the Indian state of West Bengal. She has acted in several Hindi and Bengali films.

== Personal life ==
From a very early age, Das felt more inclined to her current gender identity as it is today, but her school labeled her as a boy. When she decided to come out as a woman to her family, they initially did not accept her gender identity. After several years of at her university and in the street, and the onset of depression from her home life, Das left to go to an NGO, called Rikti. Here, an advocate, Santiranjan Basu found a job for her, as an proofreader. In 2003, she went back to her family where they finally accepted her as a woman

A year later, Das underwent sex reassignment surgery under Dr. Sheila Rohatgi, a prominent plastic surgeon from Kolkata, paid thank to the help of her parents. The surgery coincided with her birthday, happening on May 9, 2004. “I insisted that I be operated on this day. I wanted a rebirth and this was it”. Following this, Tista went public with her identity and was the source of controversy and social upheaval regarding stereotypes associated with the transsexual community. Her case played a pivotal role in changing misconceptions in Indian society about transsexuality, and provoked a positive national debate in the press and the media on the ethics of sex change and transsexual rights in India. She is regarded by many as an icon of empowerment and choice for the transsexual community in India.

Aside from her work in activism, Tista is also a prominent actress with a string of film and television soap appearances to her credit.

Although she was rejected admission initially for undergraduate studies at Rabindra Bharati University, she graduated through correspondence from Bethune College of the University of Calcutta.

In 2019, Das married Dipan Chakraborty, who is a transgender man. The occasion of their wedding made them the first married trans couple of West Bengal.

== Career ==
Tista Das is an actress and community based counsellor by profession and has quite a few films and various television roles and appearances to her credit. She has also worked as research assistant in Calcutta for Rooprekha Chowdhury. a University of California, Berkeley fellow on a research project on the life style of trans-sexuals and their acceptance in society.

She acted in Sohini Dasgupta's, documentary I Couldn't Be Your Son, Mom - "It is the story of a courageous young person who denies the life she has been given,” says Buddhadeb Dasgupta who has produced the 20- minute documentary directed by Sohini Dasgupta. She played a role in Subrata Dutta’s 45-minute film The Third Gender? which was screened at the Bulgaria film festival in 2006. She also plays the lead role in Beyond Reflections, a movie about her life directed by Umesh Bist.Tista Das also acted alongside June Maliah in Shankho Ghosh’s full-length feature film Ebong Fera and telefilm Naari where she plays a college girl.

She was selected for acting in one of Akash Bangla’s series Sahityer Sera Somoy. Tista Das is also getting ready with a book on her life, which she will call Shudhu Hridoyer Jonyo.In 2014, she has acted as Heroin in a 48 minutes short film called "Arekti Jiboner Golpo", based on a true story of a post operative Bengali Transsexual girl. The film was tribute to the film maker Rituparno Ghosh.

She completed two films in Bengali where she played the protagonist of the film. In Hrisikesh Mondal's docu-feature Achena Bondhutto Tista Das played as a Psychological counselor. Her role in Achena Bondhutto is about the battle to gain acceptance and convince people that the Transgender community has many more things to do than clapping hands and exposing offences. The film's theme song has been sung by leading Bengali rock singers like Rupam Islam of Fossils, Sidhu of Cactus and Surojit Chatterjee of Bhoomi - all of whom have thrown their weight behind the project.

On the other movie punorbasan, Tista Das played the lead role of an intersexed daughter of a jamindar family in Sobha Bazar. She appeared as a painter in the film who fall in love of a documentary film maker came from Mumbai. This is the first film of a senior journalist Jishnudeep Barman who is really happy and satisfied to cast Tista Das as heroine in the story.

Having had positive responses from some of Calcutta's well-known theater companies, Tista Das was supposed to join Shaonli Mitra’s Pancham Baidik. But rejected because of her free gender expression in media. Finally she joined in the intimate unconventional theater group Bivaban Theatre Academy. As times goes on she was invited to take part in many stage plays from many theater groups in Kolkata.

== Filmography ==
- Documentary – I could not be your son, mom, (2002)
- Short Film- Ebong Fera, (2004)
- Telefilm – Naari, (2004)
- Short film- The Third Gender?, (2006)
- Documentary Beyond Reflections, (2009)
- Short film Rupantar, (2012)
- Documentary - Maa I Exist Beyond X&Y (2013)
- Short Film- Arekti Jiboner Golpo/Story Of Another Life (2013)
- Feature film- Achena Bondhutto, (2014)
- Feature film- Punarbasan, (2014)
