= Moslehuddin Ahmed =

West Bengal politician

Member of West Bengal Legislative Assembly
- In office 1982–1987
- Preceded by: Ahindra Sarkar
- Succeeded by: Minati Ghosh
- Constituency: Gangarampur
- In office 1971–1977
- Preceded by: Ahindra Sarkar
- Succeeded by: Ahindra Sarkar
- Constituency: Gangarampur

Personal details
- Born: Dinajpur district, Bengal Presidency
- Party: Indian National Congress; Indian Congress (Socialist)

Moslehuddin Ahmed was an Indian politician belonging to the Indian National Congress. He was a three-time MLA for Gangarampur at the West Bengal Legislative Assembly.

== Career ==
Ahmed successfully contested in the 1971 West Bengal Legislative Assembly election where he ran as a Communist Party of India candidate for Gangarampur Assembly constituency, defeating former MLA and Communist politician Ahindra Sarker. He contested in the 1972 West Bengal Legislative Assembly election where he regained his seat after defeating Sarker once again. Ahmed lost to Sarker at the 1977 West Bengal Legislative Assembly election. Ahmed contested in the 1982 West Bengal Legislative Assembly election where he ran as an Indian Congress (Socialist) candidate, defeating Marxist politician Arabinda Chakraborty. He returned to the Indian National Congress at the 1987 West Bengal Legislative Assembly election but lost in this election.
