= Itahar Assembly constituency =

Itahar
- Constituency No. 36 for the West Bengal Legislative Assembly
- Interactive Map Outlining Itahar Assembly Constituency

Constituency details
- Country: India
- Region: East India
- State: West Bengal
- District: Uttar Dinajpur
- Lok Sabha constituency: Balurghat
- Established: 1951
- Total electors: 211,669
- Reservation: None

Member of Legislative Assembly
- 18th West Bengal Legislative Assembly
- Incumbent Mosaraf Hussen
- Party: All India Trinamool Congress
- Elected year: 2026

Itahar Assembly constituency is an assembly constituency in Uttar Dinajpur district in the Indian state of West Bengal.

== Overview ==
As per orders of the Delimitation Commission, No. 36 Itahar Assembly constituency covers Itahar community development block.

Itahar Assembly constituency is part of No. 6 Balurghat (Lok Sabha constituency). It was earlier part of Raiganj (Lok Sabha constituency)

== Members of the Legislative Assembly ==
| Year | Name | Party |
|---|---|---|
| 1951 | Banamali Das | Indian National Congress |
| 1957 | Basanta Lal Chatterjee | Communist Party of India |
| 1962 | Dr. Zainal Abedin | Indian National Congress |
| 1967 | Dr. Zainal Abedin | Indian National Congress |
| 1969 | Dr. Zainal Abedin | Indian National Congress |
| 1971 | Dr. Zainal Abedin | Indian National Congress |
| 1972 | Dr. Zainal Abedin | Indian National Congress |
| 1977 | Dr. Zainal Abedin | Indian National Congress |
| 1982 | Dr. Zainal Abedin | Indian Congress (Socialist) |
| 1987 | Swadesh Chaki | Communist Party of India |
| 1991 | Dr. Zainal Abedin | Indian National Congress |
| 1996 | Srikumar Mukherjee | Communist Party of India |
| 2001 | Srikumar Mukherjee | Communist Party of India |
| 2006 | Srikumar Mukherjee | Communist Party of India |
| 2011 | Amal Acharjee | All India Trinamool Congress |
| 2016 | Amal Acharjee | All India Trinamool Congress |
| 2021 | Mosaraf Hussen | All India Trinamool Congress |
| 2026 | Mosaraf Hussen | All India Trinamool Congress |

== Election results ==
=== 2026 ===
In the 2026 West Bengal Legislative Assembly election, Mosaraf Hussen of TMC defeated his nearest rival Sabita Barman of BJP by 27878 votes.

2026 West Bengal Legislative Assembly election: Itahar
| Party | Candidate | Votes | % | ±% |
|---|---|---|---|---|
| AITC | Mosaraf Hussen | 98,172 | 48.09 | ▼11.01 |
| BJP | Sabita Barman | 70,294 | 34.43 | ▼2.0 |
| INC | Amal Acharjee | 28,045 | 13.74 | |
| CPI | Utpal Das | 3,015 | 1.48 | ▼1.05 |
| NOTA | None of the above | 699 | 0.34 | ▼0.3 |
| Majority | | 27,878 | 13.66 | ▼9.01 |
| Turnout | | 204,159 | 96.45 | ▲11.87 |
| AITC hold | | Swing | 4.5 | |

=== 2021 ===
In the 2021 elections, Mosaraf Hussen of AITC defeated his nearest rival Amit Kumar Kundu of BJP.

West Bengal assembly elections, 2021: Itahar constituency
| Party | Candidate | Votes | % | ±% |
|---|---|---|---|---|
| AITC | Mosaraf Hussen | 114,645 | 59.1 | |
| BJP | Amit Kumar Kundu | 70,670 | 36.43 | +32.22 |
| CPI | Srikumar Mukherjee | 4,908 | 2.53 | −38.44 |
| NOTA | None of the above | 1,240 | 0.64 | |
| Majority | | 43,975 | 22.67 | |
| Turnout | | 193,986 | 84.58 | |
| AITC hold | | Swing | | |

=== 2016 ===
In the 2016 elections, Amal Acharjee of AITC defeated his nearest rival Srikumar Mukherjee of CPI.

West Bengal assembly elections, 2016: Itahar constituency
| Party | Candidate | Votes | % | ±% |
|---|---|---|---|---|
| AITC | Amal Acharjee | 88,507 | 52.26 | +8.31 |
| CPI | Srikumar Mukherjee | 69,387 | 40.97 | +2.40 |
| BJP | Yunish Hoque | 7,126 | 4.21 | +2.22 |
| NOTA | None of the above | 1,743 | 1.03 | |
| JDP | Hopna Murmu | 1,576 | 0.93 | +0.30 |
| BSP | Jainal Abedin | 1,008 | 0.60 | |
| Turnout | | 169,347 | 83.74 | −1.81 |
| AITC hold | | Swing | | |

=== 2011 ===
In the 2011 elections, Amal Acharjee of AITC defeated his nearest rival Srikumar Mukherjee of CPI.

West Bengal assembly elections, 2011: Itahar constituency
| Party | Candidate | Votes | % | ±% |
|---|---|---|---|---|
| AITC | Amal Acharjee | 61,707 | 43.95 | +31.98 |
| CPI | Srikumar Mukherjee | 54,655 | 38.93 | −5.02 |
| Independent | Md. Rakbul Boksh | 16,803 | 11.97 | |
| BJP | Suman Kumar Acharjee | 2,794 | 1.99 | |
| Independent | Manik Chandra Sarkar | 2,222 | 1.58 | |
| JDP | Hopna Murmu | 889 | 0.63 | |
| IPFB | Abdur Razaqque | 679 | 0.48 | |
| CPI(ML)L | Suleman Hafiji | 653 | 0.47 | |
| Turnout | | 140,402 | 85.55 | +0.03 |
| AITC gain from CPI | | Swing | -1.93# | |

.# Swing calculated on Trinamool+Congress vote percentages taken together in 2006.

.# Md. Rakbul Boksh, contesting as an independent candidate, was a rebel Trinamool Congress candidate, he was suspended from the party.

=== 2006 ===
In the 2006, 2001 and 1996 state assembly elections Srikumar Mukherjee of CPI won the 36 Itahar assembly seat defeating his nearest rivals Amal Acharjee of Congress in 2006, Dr. Zainal Abedin of NCP in 2001 and Dr. Zainal Abedin representing Congress in 1996. Contests in most years were multi cornered but only winners and runners are being mentioned. Dr. Zainal Abedin of Congress defeated Swadesh Chaki of CPI in 1991. Swadesh Chaki of CPI defeated Dr. Zainal Abedin of Congress in 1987. Dr. Zainal Abedin of ICS/Congress defeated Basanta Lal Chatterjee of CPI in 1982 and Salil Kumar Guha of CPI(M) in 1977.

=== 1972 ===
Dr. Zainal Abedin of Congress won in 1972, 1971, 1969, 1967 and 1962. Basanta Lal Chatterjee of CPI won in 1957. Banamali Das of Congress won in 1951.
