= Gangarampur Assembly constituency =

Gangarampur
- Constituency No. 41 for the West Bengal Legislative Assembly
- Interactive Map Outlining Gangarampur Assembly Constituency

Constituency details
- Country: India
- Region: East India
- State: West Bengal
- District: Dakshin Dinajpur
- Lok Sabha constituency: Balurghat
- Established: 1951
- Total electors: 224,040
- Reservation: SC

Member of Legislative Assembly
- 18th West Bengal Legislative Assembly
- Incumbent Satyendra Nath Ray
- Party: BJP
- Alliance: NDA
- Elected year: 2026

Gangarampur Assembly constituency is an assembly constituency in Dakshin Dinajpur district in the Indian state of West Bengal. It is reserved for scheduled castes.

== Overview ==
As per orders of the Delimitation Commission, No. 41 Gangarampur Assembly constituency (SC) covers Gangarampur municipality, Belbari I, Damdama, Gangarampur and Nandanpur gram panchayats of Gangrampur community development block, and Ajmatpur, Autina, Gurail, Hazratpur, Ramchandrapur and Rampara Chenchra gram panchayats of Tapan community development block.

Gangarampur Assembly constituency (SC) is part of No. 6 Balurghat (Lok Sabha constituency).

== Members of the Legislative Assembly ==
Year	Member	Party
1951	Satindra Nath Basu	Indian National Congress
1957	Lakshman Chandra Hansda	Indian National Congress
1957	Satindra Nath Basu	Indian National Congress
1962	Mangla Kisku	Communist Party of India
1967	Khalil Sayed	Indian National Congress
1969	Ahindra Sarkar	Communist Party of India
1971	Moslehuddin Ahmed	Indian National Congress
1972	Moslehuddin Ahmed	Indian National Congress
1977	Ahindra Sarkar	Communist Party of India (Marxist)
1982	Moslehuddin Ahmed	Indian Congress (Socialist)
1987	Minati Ghosh	Communist Party of India (Marxist)
1991	Minati Ghosh	Communist Party of India (Marxist)
1996	Minati Ghosh	Communist Party of India (Marxist)
2001	Narayan Biswas	Communist Party of India (Marxist)
2006	Narayan Biswas	Communist Party of India (Marxist)
2011	Satyendra Nath Ray	All India Trinamool Congress
2016	Goutam Das	Indian National Congress
2021	Satyendra Nath Ray	Bharatiya Janata Party
2026	Satyendra Nath Ray	Bharatiya Janata Party

== Election results ==
=== 2026 ===
2026 West Bengal Legislative Assembly election: Gangarampur
Party	Candidate	Votes	%	±%
BJP	Satyendra Nath Ray	105,083	54.5	+7.68
AITC	Goutam Das	76,744	39.8	−4.6
CPI(M)	Biplab Barman	5,991	3.11	−3.37
INC	JUI BARMAN	1,570	0.81	−3.37
NOTA	None of the above	1,438	0.75	+0.14
Majority		28,339	14.7	+12.28
Turnout		192,823	96.19	+11.61
BJP hold		Swing		

=== 2021 ===
2021 West Bengal Legislative Assembly election: Gangarampur
Party	Candidate	Votes	%	±%
BJP	Satyendra Nath Ray	88,724	46.82	
AITC	Goutam Das	84,132	44.4	
CPI(M)	Nandalal Hazra	12,273	6.48	
NOTA	None of the above	1,149	0.61	
Majority		4,592	2.42	
Turnout		189,482	84.58	
BJP gain from INC		Swing		

=== 2016 ===
In the 2016 election, Goutam Das of Congress defeated his nearest rival, Satyendra Nath Ray of Trinamool Congress.

West Bengal assembly elections, 2016: Gangarampur (SC) constituency
Party	Candidate	Votes	%	±%
INC	Goutam Das	80,401	46.37	
AITC	Satyendra Nath Ray	69,668	40.18	−5.67
BJP	Sanatan Karmakar	17,604	10.15	+7.06
NOTA	None of the above	2,432	1.40	
BSP	Jatindra Nath Barman	1,486	0.86	
CPI(ML) Red Star	Sukla Bhuimali	1,068	0.62	
Independent	Bimal Chandra Barman	719	0.41	
Turnout		173,378	87.25	−2.60
INC gain from AITC		Swing		

=== 2011 ===
In the 2011 election, Satyendra Nath Ray of Trinamool Congress defeated his nearest rival Nandalal Hazra of CPI(M).

West Bengal assembly elections, 2011: Gangarampur (SC) constituency
Party	Candidate	Votes	%	±%
AITC	Satyendra Nath Ray	65,666	45.85	+1.38#
CPI(M)	Nandalal Hazra	64,998	45.38	−6.82
BJP	Dipankar Roy	4,432	3.09	
Independent	Akshay Sarkar	2,127		
Independent	Sreepada Barman	1,915		
BSP	Uttam Kumar Barman	1,267		
Independent	Susen Chandra Barman	1,121		
Independent	Sukla Bhuimali	858		
Independent	Kanak Sarkar	835		
Turnout		143,219	89.85	
AITC gain from CPI(M)		Swing	7.20#	

Shukla Bhuimali, contesting as an Indepependent, belonged to CPI(ML).

.# Swing calculated on Congress+Trinamool Congress vote percentages taken together in 2006.

=== 2006 ===
In 2006 and 2001 state assembly elections Narayan Biswas of CPI(M) won the Gangarampur assembly seat defeating his nearest rival Biplab Mitra of Trinamool Congress. Minati Ghosh of CPI(M) defeated Asish Majumdar of BJP in 1996, Biplab Mitra of Congress in 1991 and Moslehuddin Ahmed of Congress in 1987. Moslehuddin Ahmed representing ICS defeated Arabinda Chakrabarty of CPI(M) in 1982. Ahindra Sarkar of CPI(M) defeated Moslehuddin Ahmed of Congress in 1977.

=== 1972 ===
Moslehuddin Ahmed of Congress won in 1972 and 1971. Ahindra Sarkar of CPI(M) won in 1969. Khalil Sayed of Congress won in 1967. Mangla Kisku of CPI won in 1962. Lakshman Chandra Hansda and Satindra Nath Basu, both of Congress, won in 1957, when Gangarampur was a joint seat. Satindra Nath Basu of Congress won in independent India's first election in 1951.
