= Khalil Sayed =

West Bengal politician

Member of West Bengal Legislative Assembly
- In office 1967–1969
- Preceded by: Mangla Kisku
- Succeeded by: Ahindra Sarker
- Constituency: Gangarampur
- In office 1962–1967
- Preceded by: Constituency established
- Succeeded by: Jatindra Mohan Roy
- Constituency: Kushmandi

Personal details
- Born: 1960 (age 64–65) Dinajpur district, Bengal Presidency
- Party: Indian National Congress; Communist Party of India

Khalil Sayed was an Indian politician who belongs to the Indian National Congress. He was the inaugural MLA for Kushmandi at the West Bengal Legislative Assembly.

== Early life and family ==
Sayed was born into a Bengali Muslim family in the Dinajpur district of the Bengal Presidency.

== Career ==
Sayed successfully contested in the 1962 West Bengal Legislative Assembly election where he ran as a Communist Party of India candidate for Kushmandi Assembly constituency, defeating Congress politician Maharaja Bose. He contested in the 1967 West Bengal Legislative Assembly election from the Gangarampur Assembly constituency as an Indian National Congress candidate, where he defeating Marxist politician Ahindra Sarker and regained his seat at the West Bengal Legislative Assembly. Sayed contested in the 1969 West Bengal Legislative Assembly election from Gangarampur again but lost to Sarker.
