= Mahmuda Begum =

West Bengal politician

Member of West Bengal Legislative Assembly
- In office 2011–2016
- Preceded by: Mafuja Khatun
- Succeeded by: Toraf Hossain Mandal
- Constituency: Kumarganj

Personal details
- Born: Dinajpur district, West Bengal
- Party: Trinamool Congress

Mahmuda Begum was an Indian politician belonging to the Trinamool Congress. She was an MLA for Kumarganj at the West Bengal Legislative Assembly.

== Career ==
Begum successfully contested in the 2011 West Bengal Legislative Assembly election where she ran as a Trinamool Congress candidate for Kumarganj Assembly constituency, defeating former MLA and Marxist candidate Mafuja Khatun.
