= Ranen Barman =

Indian politician (born 1969)

Member of Indian Parliament
- In office 10 May 1996 — 17 May 2009
- Preceded by: Palas Barman
- Succeeded by: Prasanta Kumar Majumdar
- Constituency: Balurghat

Personal details
- Born: 2 March 1969 (age 57) Dinajpur, West Bengal
- Party: RSP
- As of 17 September, 2006

Ranen Barman (born 2 March 1969) is a member of the 14th Lok Sabha of India. He represented the Balurghat constituency of West Bengal and is a member of the Revolutionary Socialist Party (RSP) political party.
