= Amal Acharjee =

Indian politician

Member of the West Bengal Legislative Assembly
- In office 2011–2021
- Preceded by: Srikumar Mukherjee
- Succeeded by: Mosaraf Hussen
- Constituency: Itahar

Personal details
- Party: Indian National Congress
- Other political affiliations: Bhartiya Janata Party and All India Trinamool Congress
- Occupation: Politician

Amal Acharjee is an Indian politician from the state of West Bengal. He is a member of Indian National Congress representing the Itahar (Vidhan Sabha constituency) in the West Bengal Legislative Assembly for two terms.

== Constituency ==
He represents the Itahar (Vidhan Sabha constituency) that he won in 2011 defeating Srikumar Mukherjee from the Communist Party of India.

== Political party ==
He is from the Indian National Congress .

State Legislative Assembly
Preceded by Srikumar Mukherjee; Communist Party of India	Member of the West Bengal Legislative Assembly from Itahar Assembly constituency 2011 –	Incumbent
