= Srikumar Mukherjee =

Indian politician

Srikumar Mukherjee is a politician and a former minister in the Left front government from 1996 to 2011. He is a member of the Communist Party of India (CPI) and represented Itahar Constituency, Uttar Dinajpur, West Bengal for three terms. He has a Doctorate in Mathematics from IIT Kharagpur. Mukherjee was Minister of State for Civil Defense, Govt. of West Bengal.

State Legislative Assembly
Preceded by Abedin Zainaj; Indian National Congress	Member of the West Bengal Legislative Assembly from Itahar Assembly constituency 1996 – 2011	Succeeded by Amal Acharjee; All India Trinamool Congress
