= Selku Mardi =

Indian politician

Member of Parliament, Lok Sabha
- In office 1957-1962
- Constituency: West Dinajpur, West Bengal

Personal details
- Born: 15 April 1915 Baragharia, Dinajpur, Bengal Presidency, British India
- Party: Indian National Congress
- Spouse: Churki Murmu
- Children: Two sons and one daughter

Selku Mardi was an Indian politician belonging to the Indian National Congress. He was elected to the Lok Sabha, lower house of the Parliament of India from West Dinajpur, West Bengal.
