= Poshu Khamar =

Bengali play

Poshu Khamar (first staged in 2006) is a political Bengali drama produced by the theatre group Pancham Baidik and directed by Arpita Ghosh. The drama was Bengali adaptation of George Orwell's Animal Farm. Political administration attempted to ban the staging of this drama because of its political sensitivity and the upcoming election.

== Plot ==
Inspired by George Orwell's Animal Farm the drama was a satire and criticised the communist regime of West Bengal.

== Cast ==
- Debatosh Ghosh
- Saoli Mitra
- Arpita Ghosh
- Debkamal Mondal
- Debabrata Ghoshal
- Swapan Adhya
- Palash Das
- Pallab Banerjee
- Tushar Roy

== Controversy ==
Because of the political nature of the drama and the satirical comments targeting the Communist Party of India (Marxist), which was the ruling party of West Bengal at that moment, the staging of the play was attempted to be banned by state authority. On March 14, 2011 the drama was scheduled to be staged Bansberia in the Hooghly district. The show was to start at 6 pm but the theatre group received an order from district administration where they were asked to cancel the show. Armed local police force with the directive of the additional district magistrate went there to stop the staging of the drama. They cited the violation of the code of conduct ahead of the upcoming election as the reason to stop the staging of the drama.

This action of political administration was criticised by state's intellectuals, theatre artistes and students' organisation. Theatre artistes, students gathered in front of the Academy of Fine Arts and showed their protest. Theatre personality Bibhas Chakraborty told– "During the Singur and Nandigram episode, many plays that criticised the state government's decision, were stopped from being staged. Despite repeated requests, the chief minister did not initiate any step at that time"
