= Hari Madhab Mukhopadhyay =

Indian theatre actor (1941–2025)

- Born: 3 April 1941; Balurghat, Bengal Presidency, British India (present-day West Bengal, India)
- Died: 17 March 2025 (aged 83)
- Occupations: Actor; playwright; theatre director; organiser; professor
- Children: 3
- Awards: Sangeet Natak Akademi Award (2007); Padma Shri (2026; posthumous)

Hari Madhab Mukhopadhyay (3 April 1941 – 17 March 2025) was a distinguished theatre personality from Balurghat, West Bengal, India. He was an actor, playwright, theatre director, organiser, and by profession a professor. He was the founder of the Balurghat-based theatre group Tritirtha.

In addition to receiving the Best Actor and Best Producer awards from the West Bengal Natya Akademi, he was awarded the Sangeet Natak Akademi Award in 2007 for his work as a theatre director. In 2026, he was posthumously honoured with the Padma Shri.

== Early life and education ==
Hari Madhab Mukhopadhyay was born in Balurghat, in present-day South Dinajpur district of West Bengal, then part of British India. His father was Nilkantha Mukhopadhyay. From an early age, he developed a deep attraction towards theatre. In 1956, he formed a theatre group named Taruntirtha in Balurghat.

After completing school, he moved to Kolkata for college education and regularly attended theatre performances across the city during his student years. He received training in theatre under directors Jagmohan Majumdar and Ajitesh Bandopadhyay, among others. He remained associated with the Howrah-based theatre group 'Natnatyam' for three years.

During this period, he earned a postgraduate degree in commerce from the University of Calcutta. Drawn back by his commitment to theatre, he returned to Balurghat and joined Balurghat College as a professor in 1967.

== Theatrical career ==
Due to his deep love for theatre, he remained actively involved in both professional and amateur theatre alongside his academic career. In 1969, he founded the theatre group Tritirtha in Balurghat. Up to 2008, a total of 58 plays were staged under his production and direction, including Tin Bigyani, Jal, Galileo and Debangshi.

As a fully dedicated theatre practitioner, he worked not only as an actor and director, but also took on responsibilities such as narrator, composer, lighting designer, costume designer, and set designer. He is regarded as the guiding force behind the “theatre movement” of Balurghat.

Altogether, he wrote nearly sixty plays, including short plays, one-act plays, and full-length productions. His last acting performance was in 2017 in the Rajbanshi-language production of Raktakarabi. His final directorial work was Banduk in 2018. Although his thoughts on theatre remained vibrant, declining health prevented further active involvement. He spent his retirement maintaining close contact with his colleagues from Tritirtha.

=== Plays written ===
Among several others, these are the plays he wrote.

Title	Notes
Dosh Putul	one of his first two plays; based on a story by Agatha Christie
Bahvarambha	one of his first two plays; based on a story by Anton Chekhov
Shishupal	
Aniket	
Bichhan	
Kharij	
Matritantrik	
Nikat Ganga	
Debangshi	1983
Khīrer Putul	
Chouryagatha	

=== Plays directed and performed ===
Among several others, these are the plays directed and performed by him.

Title	Notes
Pap o Papi	
Akkel Selami	
Bondi Bir	
Chhera Kagojer Jhuri	
Pakhir Basa	
Natyakarer Sandhane Chhoti Charitra	
Rajanigandha	
Char Prahar	
Chhayanayika	
Putul Khela	
Brishti Brishti	
Bishay June	
Chhutir Khela	
Tin Bigyani	
Jal	1980
Bichhan	1985 (Hindi play)
Chirakumar Sabha	
Debigirjan	
Mantrashakti	

== Awards and honours ==
- In 1977, he received the Dishari Award for producing and directing Debigirjan by Bijon Bhattacharya;
- The Government of West Bengal's Department of Information and Cultural Affairs awarded his play Debangshi as Best Production;
- In 2007, he was awarded the Sangeet Natak Akademi Award for theatre direction by the Sangeet Natak Akademi;
- In 2019, Raiganj University conferred upon him an honorary D.Litt. degree;
- In 2026, he was posthumously honoured with the Padma Shri.
