= Toraf Hossain Mandal =

Indian politician

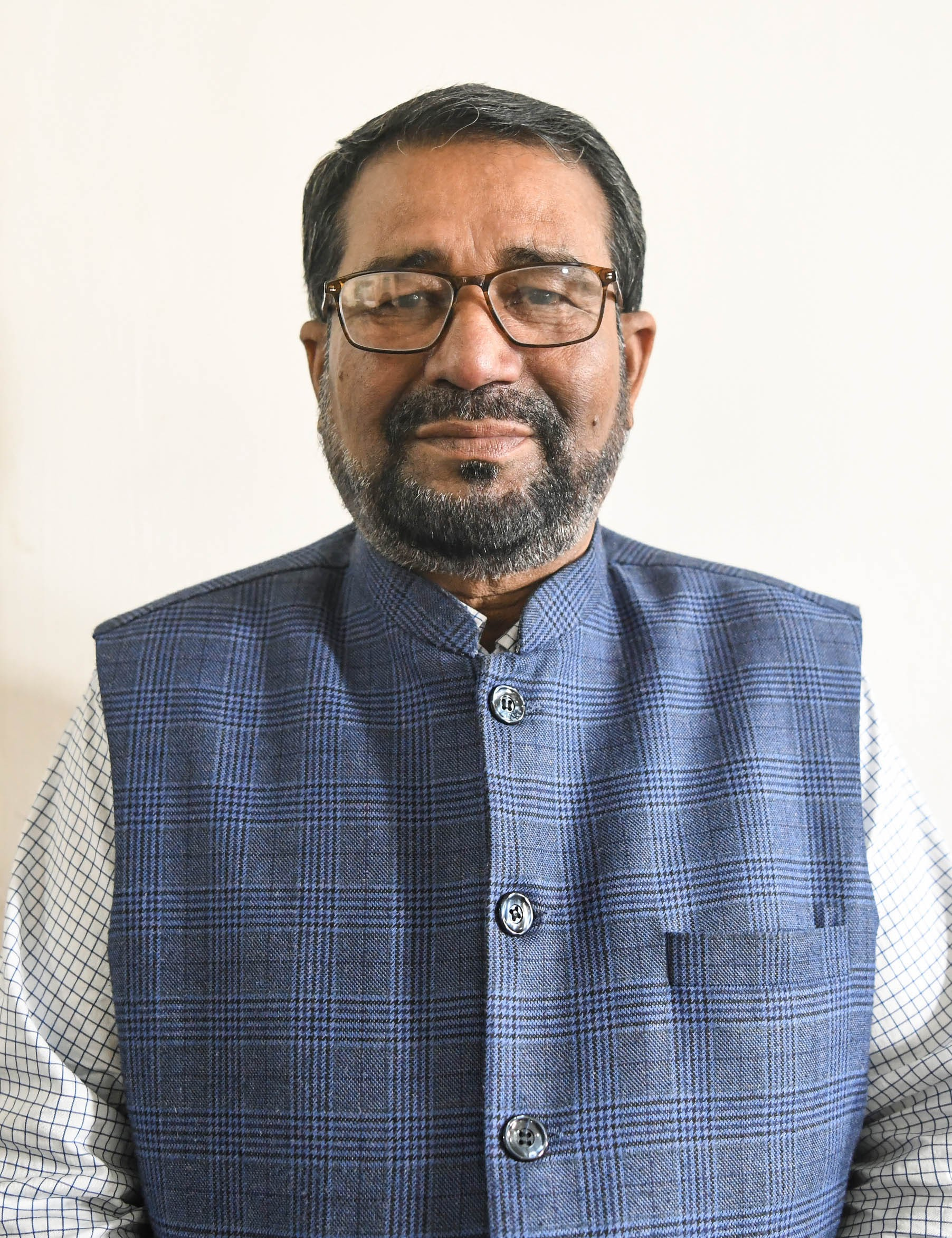

Member of the West Bengal Legislative Assembly
- Incumbent
- Assumed office 12 May 2016
- Preceded by: Mahmuda Begum
- Constituency: Kumarganj

Personal details
- Born: 1959 (age 66–67) Doraha, West Dinajpur district, West Bengal
- Party: Trinamool Congress (until 2026); Democratic Trinamool Congress (from 2026)
- Education: Balurghat College
- Occupation: Politician

Toraf Hossain Mandal is an Indian social worker and politician belonging to the Democratic Trinamool Congress . He is a member of the West Bengal Legislative Assembly.

== Early life and education ==
Mandal was born in 1959 to a Bengali family of Muslim Mandals in the village of Doraha in West Dinajpur district, West Bengal. He was the son of Haji Rahimuddin Mandal. He graduated with a Bachelor of Arts degree from Balurghat College (affiliated with University of North Bengal) in 1985.

== Career ==
Mandal worked at a madrasa. He successfully contested in the 2016 West Bengal Legislative Assembly election where he ran as a Trinamool Congress candidate for the Kumarganj Assembly constituency, defeating Marxist candidate Mafuja Khatun. Mandal regained his seat in Kumarganj following the 2021 West Bengal Legislative Assembly election where he defeated BJP candidate Manas Sarkar.
