= Gangarampur B.Ed College =

- Gangarampur B.Ed College
- Type: Bachelor of Education
- Established: 2005; 21 years ago
- Affiliations: University of Gour Banga
- Principal: Dr. Indumati Rai
- Location: Kaldighi, Gangarampur, West Bengal, India; 25.4019°N 88.5464°E
- Website: www.gmpbedcollege.in

Gangarampur B.Ed College is a Bachelor of Education college in Kaldighi, Gangarampur in the Dakshin Dinajpur district of West Bengal, India. The college is affiliated to the University of Gour Banga and approved by National Council for Teacher Education (NCTE) offering Bachelor of Education courses. Its current president is Dr. Towhid-e-Aman.

== IGNOU Study Center ==
Gangarampur B.Ed College has IGNOU study center (45010) to facilitate distance education approved by Indira Gandhi National Open University, New Delhi.
