= Pancham Baidik =

Indian theatre group

Pancham Vaidic
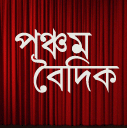
- Type: Theatre group
- Location: Kolkata, West Bengal, India
- Artistic director: Saoli Mitra Arpita Ghosh

Pancham Vaidik is a Bengali theatre group directed by Shaoli Mitra. Nathabati Anaathabat, the group's first production was staged in 1983.

== Productions ==
- Nathabati Anaathabat
- Katha Amritasaman
- Rajnaitik Hatya
- Poshu Khamar
- A–Parajita
- Ghare Baire
- Ebong Debjani
- Astomito Madhyanha
- Duto Din
- Karubasana
