= Bejebikair =

Village in West Bengal

Bejebikair Bajebikair
- Village
- Location within West Bengal Location within India
- Coordinates: 25°23′29.24″N 88°26′16.68″E
- Country: India
- State: West Bengal
- District: Dakshin Dinajpur

Area
  - Total: 0.7795 km^{2} (0.3010 sq mi)

Population (2011)
  - Total: 380
  - Male: 210
  - Female: 170

Muslims = 100% ▲ Hindus = 0% Others (Christian, Sikh, Buddhists) = 0%

Languages
  - Official: Bengali, English
- Time zone: UTC+5:30 (IST)
- PIN: 733147
- Telephone Code: 03524
- Vehicle registration: WB
- Climate: Moderate, Comfortable (Köppen)
- Lok Sabha constituency: Balurghat
- Nearest city: Buniadpur
- Website: ddinajpur.nic.in

Bejebikair also known as Bajebikair is a small village located in Bansihari subdivision of Dakshin Dinajpur district in West Bengal, India.

== Location ==
It is situated 5.4 km (3.4 mi) from sub-district headquarters Buniadpur. Balurghat is the district headquarters of this village. The total geographical area of the village is 77.95 hectares (192.6 acres; 0.7795 km^{2}). The village code of this village is 311778.

== Population ==
With about 89 houses, this village has a total population of 380 people amongst them are 210 male and 170 female and a total geographical area of 77.95 hectares (192.6 acres) or 0.7795 km^{2}. The literacy rate of the total population of this village is 80.26% among 84.29% males and 75.29% females are literate.

== See also ==
- Mirzadpur village in Dakshin Dinajpur.
- Dahuakuri village in Dakshin Dinajpur.
