= Mirzadpur =

Village in West Bengal

- Village
- Location within West Bengal Location within India
- Coordinates: 25°23′49.01″N 88°24′35.02″E
- Country: India
- State: West Bengal
- District: Dakshin Dinajpur

Area
  - Total: 0.6155 km^{2} (0.2376 sq mi)

Population (2011)
  - Total: 1,442
  - Male: 714
  - Female: 728

Muslims = 100% ▲ Hindus = 0% Others (Christian, Sikh, Buddhists) = 0%

Languages
  - Official: Bengali, English
- Time zone: UTC+5:30 (IST)
- PIN: 733121
- Telephone Code: 03524
- Vehicle registration: WB
- Climate: Moderate, Comfortable (Köppen)
- Lok Sabha constituency: Balurghat
- Nearest city: Buniadpur
- Website: ddinajpur.nic.in

Mirzadpur is a village located in Bansihari subdivision of Dakshin Dinajpur district in West Bengal, India.

== Location ==
It is situated 2.1 km (1.3 mi) from sub-district headquarters Buniadpur. Balurghat is the district headquarters of this village. Shibpur gram panchayat is the gram panchayat of this village. The total geographical area of the village is 61.55 hectares (152.1 acres; 0.6155 km^{2}). The village code of this village is 311789.

== Population ==
With about 323 houses, this village has a total population of 1,442 people amongst them are 714 male and 728 female and a total geographical area of 61.55 hectares (152.1 acres) or 0.6155 km^{2}. The literacy rate of the total population of this village is 61.03% among 66.95% males and 55.22% females are literate.

== See also ==
- Dahuakuri village in Dakshin Dinajpur.
- Bejebikair village in Dakshin Dinajpur.
