= Kumarganj Assembly constituency =

Kumarganj
- Constituency No. 38 for the West Bengal Legislative Assembly
- Interactive Map Outlining Kumarganj Assembly Constituency

Constituency details
- Country: India
- Region: East India
- State: West Bengal
- District: Dakshin Dinajpur
- Lok Sabha constituency: Balurghat
- Established: 1967
- Total electors: 203,986
- Reservation: None

Member of Legislative Assembly
- 18th West Bengal Legislative Assembly
- Incumbent Toraf Hossain Mandal
- Party: Democratic Trinamool Congress
- Elected year: 2026

Kumarganj Assembly constituency is an assembly constituency in Dakshin Dinajpur district in the Indian state of West Bengal.

== Overview ==
As per orders of the Delimitation Commission, No. 38 Kumarganj Assembly constituency covers Kumarganj community development block and Ashokegram, Basuria, Chaloon and Uday gram panchayats of Gangarampur community development block.

Kumarganj Assembly constituency is part of No. 6 Balurghat (Lok Sabha constituency).

== Members of the Legislative Assembly ==
| Year | Member | Party |
|---|---|---|
| 1967 | M. Bose | Indian National Congress |
| 1969 | Abinash Basu | Bangla Congress |
| 1971 | Probodh Kumar Singha Roy | Indian National Congress |
| 1972 | Probodh Kumar Singha Roy | Indian National Congress |
| 1977 | Jamini Kishore Mojumdar | Communist Party of India |
| 1982 | Dwijendra Nath Roy | Communist Party of India |
| 1987 | Dwijendra Mondal | Communist Party of India |
| 1991 | Dwijendra Nath Roy | Communist Party of India |
| 1996 | Dwijendra Nath Roy | Communist Party of India |
| 2001 | Mafuja Khatun | Communist Party of India |
| 2006 | Mafuja Khatun | Communist Party of India |
| 2011 | Mahmuda Begum | All India Trinamool Congress |
| 2016 | Toraf Hossain Mandal | All India Trinamool Congress |
| 2021 | Toraf Hossain Mandal | All India Trinamool Congress |

== Election results ==
=== 2026 ===
2026 West Bengal Legislative Assembly election: Kumarganj
| Party | Candidate | Votes | % | ±% |
|---|---|---|---|---|
| AITC | Toraf Hossain Mandal | 82,791 | 47.62 | −4.9 |
| BJP | Suvendu Sarkar | 76,106 | 43.77 | +8.44 |
| CPI(M) | Mofazzal Hossain | 10,149 | 5.84 | |
| NOTA | None of the above | 789 | 0.45 | −0.21 |
| Majority | | 6,685 | 3.85 | −13.34 |
| Turnout | | 173,869 | 96.26 | +12.47 |
| AITC hold | | Swing | | |

=== 2021 ===
West Bengal assembly elections, 2021: Kumarganj constituency
| Party | Candidate | Votes | % | ±% |
|---|---|---|---|---|
| AITC | Toraf Hossain Mandal | 89,763 | 52.52 | |
| BJP | Manas Sarkar | 60,396 | 35.33 | |
| INC | Chaudhuri Nargis Banu | 17,478 | 10.23 | |
| NOTA | None of the above | 1,125 | 0.66 | |
| Majority | | 29,367 | 17.19 | |
| Turnout | | 170,928 | 83.79 | |
| AITC hold | | Swing | | |

=== 2011 ===
In the 2011 elections, Mahmuda Begum of Trinamool Congress defeated her nearest rival Mafuja Khatun of CPI(M).

West Bengal assembly elections, 2011: Kumarganj constituency
| Party | Candidate | Votes | % | ±% |
|---|---|---|---|---|
| AITC | Mahmuda Begum | 62,212 | 46.93 | +0.98# |
| CPI(M) | Mafuja Khatun | 57,994 | 43.75 | −4.98 |
| BJP | Sanjib Chandra Roy | 6,592 | 4.97 | |
| People's Democratic Conference of India | Abdullah Shaikh | 2,247 | | |
| Independent | Khajer Mondal | 2,209 | | |
| BSP | Ranendra Nath Mali | 1,296 | | |
| Turnout | | 132,550 | 89.1 | |
| AITC gain from CPI(M) | | Swing | 5.96# | |

.# Swing calculated on Congress+Trinamool Congress vote percentages taken together in 2006.

=== 2006 ===
In the 2006 and 2001 state assembly elections, Mafuja Khatun of CPI(M) won the Kumarganj assembly seat defeating her nearest rivals Ahmad Ali Sardar and Nani Gopal Roy, both of Trinamool Congress respectively. Contests in most years were multi cornered but only winners and runners are being mentioned. Dwijendra Nath Roy of CPI(M) defeated Parinita Singha Roy of Congress in 1996 and Prabodh Kumar Singha Roy of Congress in 1991. Dwijendra Mondal of CPI(M) defeated Afrabuddin Sarkar of Congress in 1987. Dwijendra Nath Roy of CPI(M) defeated Sekhar Kumar Dasgupta of Congress in 1982. Jamini Kishore Mojumdar of CPI(M) defeated Khalil Sayed of Congress in 1977.

=== 1972 ===
Probodh Kumar Singha Roy of Congress won 1972 and 1971. Abinash Basu of Bangla Congress won in 1969. M.Bose of Congress won in 1967.
