= Gour Mahavidyalaya =

College in West Bengal, India

- Gour College
- Emblem Of Gour Mahavidyalaya
- Motto: Teach Our Aim
- Type: Public college Coed
- Established: 1985; 41 years ago
- Affiliations: University of Gour Banga
- Principal: Dr. Ashim Kumar Sarkar
- Academic staff: 70
- Students: 7000
- Location: Mangal Bari, Old Malda, Malda City, West Bengal, 732142, India; 25°01′15.15″N 88°08′50.03″E
- Campus: Urban
- Website: www.gourmaha.org
- Location within West Bengal Location within India

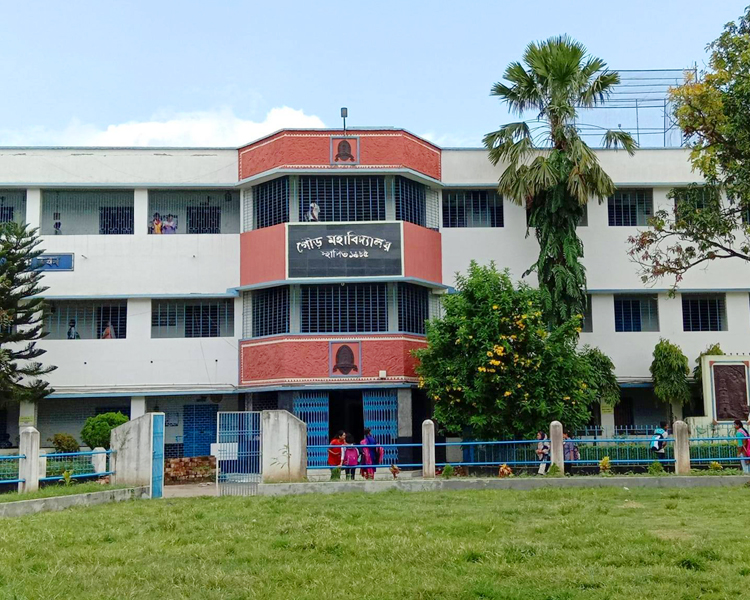

Gour Mahavidyalaya (abbreviated as GM) is a college in Old Malda in the Malda district of West Bengal, India. The college is affiliated to the University of Gour Banga, offering undergraduate courses. It is the only college in Malda and nearby districts which offers a 3-year B.A. (Honours) degree in Mass Communication and Journalism. The college is located at Mangal Bari, a neighborhood of Old Malda, under UA city of Malda.

== Accreditation ==
Now the college is accredited Grade B++ (3rd Cycle) by NAAC. It is also recognized by the UGC.

== Notable alumni ==
- Sabina Yeasmin

== See also ==
- List of institutions of higher education in West Bengal
- Education in India
- Education in West Bengal
