= Sarkar Murmu =

Indian politician (born 1926)

Member of Legislative Assembly, West Bengal
- In office 1971–1972, 1977 – 1996
- Preceded by: Nimai Chand Murmu, Rabindranath Murmu
- Succeeded by: Rabindranath Murmu Jadu Hembram
- Constituency: Habibpur

Member of Parliament, Lok Sabha
- In office 1962–1967
- Preceded by: Chapala Kanta Bhattacharjee
- Succeeded by: Jatindra Nath Pramanick
- Constituency: Balurghat, West Bengal

Personal details
- Born: 1926 Jassail, Gomadhapur, Bengal Presidency, British India
- Party: Communist Party of India (Marxist); Communist Party of India; Independent
- Spouse: Maina Saren
- Children: One sons and three daughters

Sarkar Murmu (born 1926) was an Indian politician belonging to the Communist Party of India. He was elected to the Lok Sabha, lower house of the Parliament of India from Balurghat, West Bengal.
