= Gangarampur Stadium =

Stadium in Gangarampur, West Bengal, India

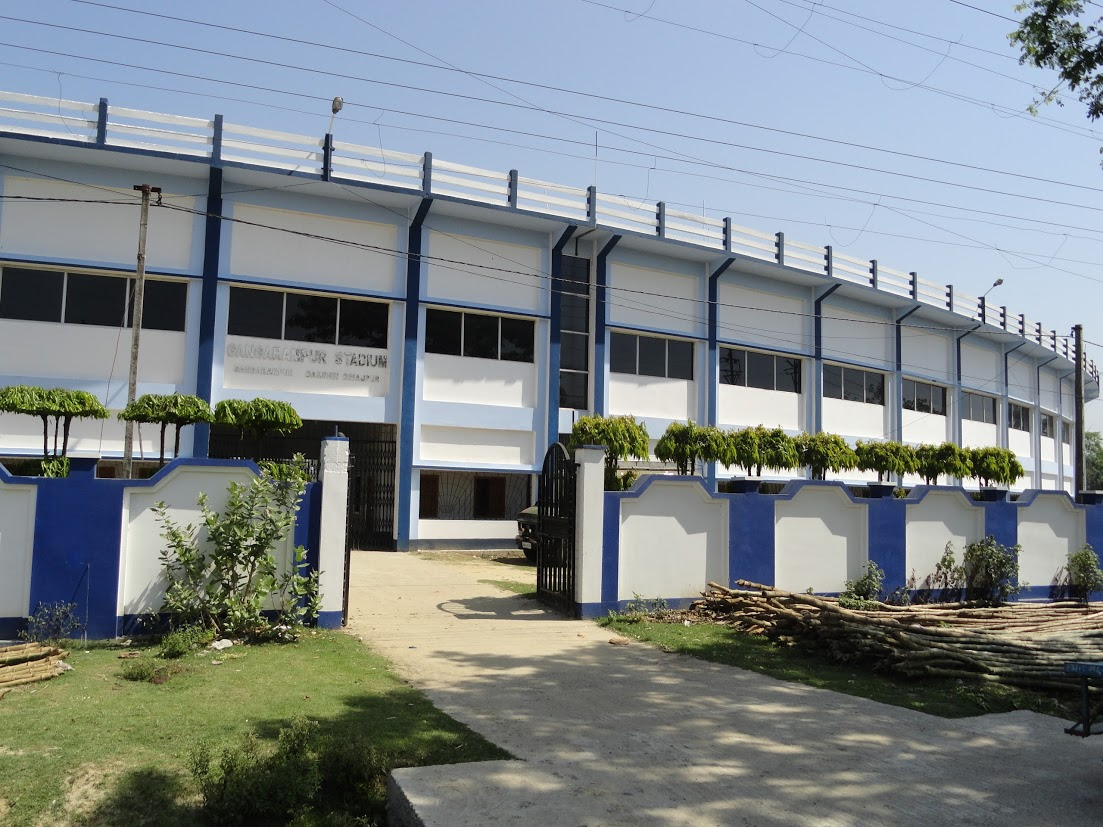
- Gangarampur Stadium
- Location: Gangarampur, West Bengal, India
- Coordinates: 25.4046°N 88.5378°E
- Establishment: 2001
- Capacity: 10,000
- Owner: Gangarampur Municipality

Gangarampur Stadium is a Stadium located beside the State Highway 10 near Kaldighi in Gangarampur, West Bengal. The stadium was built in early twenty first century.
