= Minati Ghosh =

Indian politician

Minati Ghosh (born 1947) is an Indian politician from West Bengal. She is a three time former member of the West Bengal Legislative Assembly from Gangarampur Assembly constituency, which is reserved for Scheduled Caste community, in Dakshin Dinajpur district. She was last elected in the 1996 West Bengal Legislative Assembly election representing the Communist Party of India (Marxist).

== Early life and education ==
Ghosh is from Gangarampur, Dakshin Dinajpur district, West Bengal. She married Kishalay Roy. She completed her MA in Bengali at the University of Calcutta in 1970.

== Career ==
Ghosh was first elected as an MLA representing the Communist Party of India (Marxist) from Gangarampur Assembly constituency in the 1987 West Bengal Legislative Assembly election. She retained the seat for the Communist Party in the 1991 West Bengal Legislative Assembly election. In the next election, she won for the third time on the Communist Party ticket in the 1996 Assembly election. She polled 84,218 and defeated her nearest rival, Ashish Majumdar of the Bharatiya Janata Party, by a margin of 22,337 votes.

In 2004, she also contested on the Communist Party of India (Marxist) ticket from Raiganj Lok Sabha constituency in the 2004 Indian general election in West Bengal. She polled 382,757 votes and lost to Priya Ranjan Dasmunsi of the Indian National Congress, by a margin of 39,147 votes.

She served as the chairperson of the CPM's Control Commission. She is also an ex officio member of the 14 member state committee which looks after the party's internal complaints.
