= Prasanta Kumar Majumdar =

Indian politician (1941–2019)

Member of parliament, Lok Sabha
- In office 16 May 2009 – 16 May 2014
- Preceded by: Ranen Barman
- Succeeded by: Arpita Ghosh
- Constituency: Balurghat

Personal details
- Born: 1 January 1941 Balurghat, Dinajpur, Bengal Presidency, British India
- Died: 27 March 2019 (aged 78) Balurghat, West Dinajpur, West Bengal, India
- Party: RSP
- As of 14 August, 2012

Prasanta Kumar Majumdar (1 January 1941 – 27 March 2019) was an Indian Politician belonging to the Revolutionary Socialist Party. He was elected to the Lok Sabha, lower house of the Parliament of India from Balurghat West Bengal in 2009. He died on 27 March 2019 at the age of 78.
