= Palas Barman =

Indian politician (1929–2000)

Member of parliament, Lok Sabha
- In office 1977–1996
- Preceded by: Rasendranath Barman
- Succeeded by: Ranen Barman
- Constituency: Balurghat, West Bengal

Personal details
- Born: 1 January 1929 Bhaginagar, Dinajpur, Bengal Presidency, British India
- Died: 10 June 2000 (aged 71) Balurghat
- Party: RSP
- Spouse: Bidyaswari Barman
- Children: Three sons and one daughter
- As of 14 August, 2012

Palas Barman (1 January 1929 – 10 June 2000), an Indian politician belonging to the Revolutionary Socialist Party. He was elected to the Lok Sabha, lower house of the Parliament of India from Balurghat West Bengal in 1977, 1980, 1984, 1989 and 1991. Barman died on 10 June 2000.
