= Mosaraf Hussen =

Indian politician

Member of the West Bengal Legislative Assembly
- Incumbent
- Assumed office 2021
- Preceded by: Amal Acharjee
- Constituency: Itahar

Personal details
- Born: 1981 (age 44–45) Itahar, Uttar Dinajpur district, West Bengal
- Party: All India Trinamool Congress
- Education: Bachelor of Arts (Part II) (Gour Mahavidyalaya)
- Occupation: Politician

Mosaraf Hussen (born 1981) is an Indian politician from the West Bengal. He is a member of the West Bengal Legislative Assembly and represents the Itahar Assembly constituency in Uttar Dinajpur district. He won the 2021 West Bengal Legislative Assembly election representing the All India Trinamool Congress.

== Early life and education ==
Hossain is from Itahar, Uttar Dinajpur district, West Bengal. He is the son of late Yeakub Ali Sarkar. He completed his Bachelor of Arts (Part II) in 2003 at Gour Mahavidyalaya, which is affiliated with University of North Bengal. His wife is a primary school teacher.

== Career ==
Hossain won from Itahar Assembly constituency representing All India Trinamool Congress in the 2021 West Bengal Legislative Assembly election. He polled 114,645 votes and defeated his nearest rival, Amit Kumar Kundu of the Bharatiya Janata Party, by a margin of 43,975 votes.
