= Mangal Bari =

- Neighborhood in Malda City
- Location in West Bengal, India Mangal Bari (India) Mangal Bari (Asia)
- Coordinates: 25.0188°N 88.1499°E
- Country: India
- State: West Bengal
- District: Malda
- Ward: 09, 10, 11, 12, 13, 14, 15, 17, 18

Government
  - Type: Municipality
  - Body: Old Malda

Area
  - Total: 6 km^{2} (2.3 sq mi)
- Elevation: 17 m (56 ft)

Population (2011)
  - Total: 21,927
  - Density: 3,700/km^{2} (9,500/sq mi)

Languages
  - Official: Bengali
  - Additional official: English
- Time zone: UTC+5:30 (IST)
- Vehicle registration: WB
- Lok Sabha constituency: Maldaha Uttar
- Vidhan Sabha constituency: Maldah
- Website: malda.nic.in

Mangal Bari is a suburb of Old Malda in Malda district of West Bengal, India. It is governed by the Old Malda Municipality.

== Geography ==
Mangal Bari is situated on the eastern bank of the Mahananda River in Malda.
