= Mafuja Khatun =

Indian politician

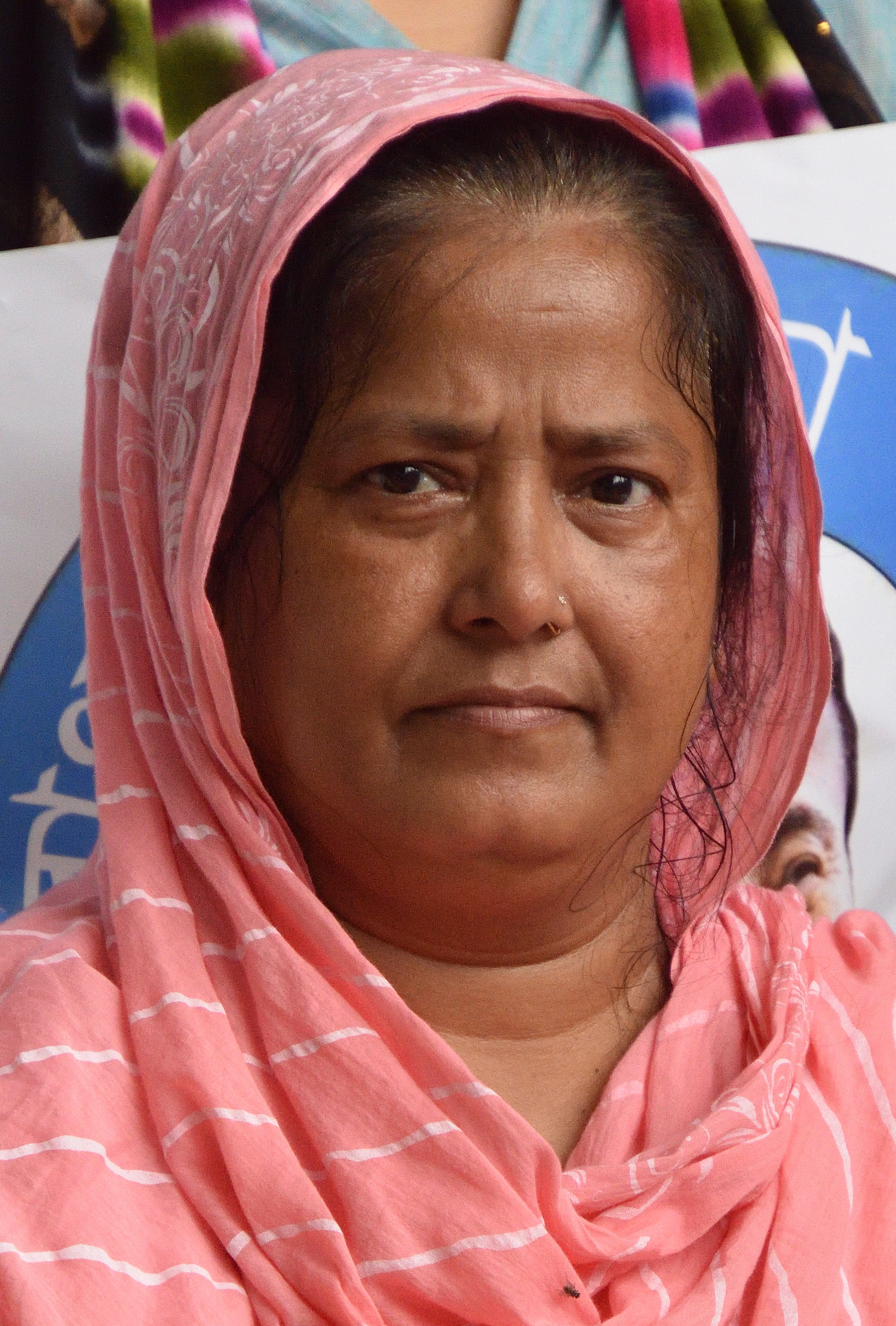
- Mafuja Khatun

Member of West Bengal Legislative Assembly
- In office 2001–2011
- Preceded by: Dwijendra Nath Roy
- Succeeded by: Mahmuda Begum
- Constituency: Kumarganj

Minority Morcha Vice-president of Bharatiya Janata Party, West Bengal
- In office 2017–2019
- Preceded by: Dilip Ghosh

Vice-president of the BJP West Bengal
- Incumbent
- Assumed office 2019
- President: Samik Bhattacharya; Sukanta Majumder; Dilip Ghosh

Personal details
- Born: June 16, 1970 (age 56) Fulbari, West Bengal, India
- Party: Bharatiya Janata Party
- Other political affiliations: Communist Party of India (Marxist)
- Education: Balurghat College

Mafuja Khatun (born 16 June 1970) is an Indian politician who is the current vice-president of Bharatiya Janata Party of West Bengal since from 2019.

Khatun is the first Muslim woman fielded by the Bharatiya Janata Party for Lok Sabha.

== Early life and education ==
Khatun was born on 16 June 1970 to a Bengali family of Muslim Syeds in Khaspara, Gangarampur, West Dinajpur district, West Bengal. She is the daughter of Sufi personality Syed Asghar Ali Shah Faqir. Khatun completed her Madhyamik Pariksha from Rampur High School in 1987 and achieved her Higher Secondary Certificate from Gangarampur High School in 1989. She graduated with a Bachelor of Arts from Balurghat College (then affiliated with University of North Bengal) in 1992.

== Career ==
In the 2006 and 2001 state assembly elections, Mafuza Khatun won the Kumarganj assembly seat from CPI(M) by defeating her nearest rivals Ahmad Ali Sardar and Nani Gopal Roy, both of Trinamool Congress respectively.

In the 2019 Lok Sabha elections, she was the Bharatiya Janata Party nominated candidate for Jangipur.
