= Satyendra Nath Ray =

Indian politician

Member of the West Bengal Legislative Assembly
- Incumbent
- Assumed office 2 May 2021
- Preceded by: Goutam Das
- Constituency: Gangarampur
- In office 2011–2016
- Preceded by: Narayan Biswas
- Succeeded by: Goutam Das
- Constituency: Gangarampur

Personal details
- Party: Bharatiya Janata Party
- Other political affiliations: All India Trinamool Congress
- Education: 10th Pass
- Profession: Cultivation and Business

Satyendra Nath Ray is an Indian politician from Bharatiya Janata Party. In May 2021, he was elected as a member of the West Bengal Legislative Assembly from Gangarampur (constituency). He defeated Goutam Das of All India Trinamool Congress by 4,592 votes in 2021 West Bengal Assembly election. Previously, he was member of the All India Trinamool Congress and won the same seat in 2011 West Bengal Assembly election.
