= Sansriti =

Bengali theatre group

- Sansriti group logo
- Formation: 9 February 1993
- Type: Theatre group
- Location: Kolkata, West Bengal, India
- Members: Debesh Chattopadhyay, Bratya Basu
- Website: http://www.theatresansriti.org/

Sansriti is a Bengali theatre group. The group was founded on 9 February 1993. Debesh Chattopadhyay is a notable member of this group. Notable eminent theatre and film personalities regularly participate in this group's plays.

== Productions ==
Sansriti has staged several full length and short length plays

=== Full length plays ===
(in alphabetical order)

- Brain
- Bikele Bhorer Shorshe Phool
- Dream Dream
- EA
- Phataru
- Pratinidhi
- Surjo Pora Chai
- Winkle Twinkle
- Prayaschittya
- Shey
- Tughlaq
- Jatugriha

=== Short length plays ===
- Break Fail
- Cadaverous
- Kanu Kahe Rai
- Shyama Sundari
- Tetri Kahini
- Maow
- Siddhidata
