= Balurghat Lok Sabha constituency =

Lok Sabha Constituency in West Bengal

Coordinates: 25°13′N 88°46′E

Balurghat WB-6
- Lok Sabha constituency
- Interactive Map Outlining Balurghat Lok Sabha Constituency

Constituency details
- Country: India
- Region: East India
- State: West Bengal
- Assembly constituencies: Itahar; Kushmandi; Kumarganj; Balurghat; Tapan; Gangarampur; Harirampur
- Established: 1962
- Total electors: 15,61,966(2024)
- Reservation: None

Member of Parliament
- 18th Lok Sabha
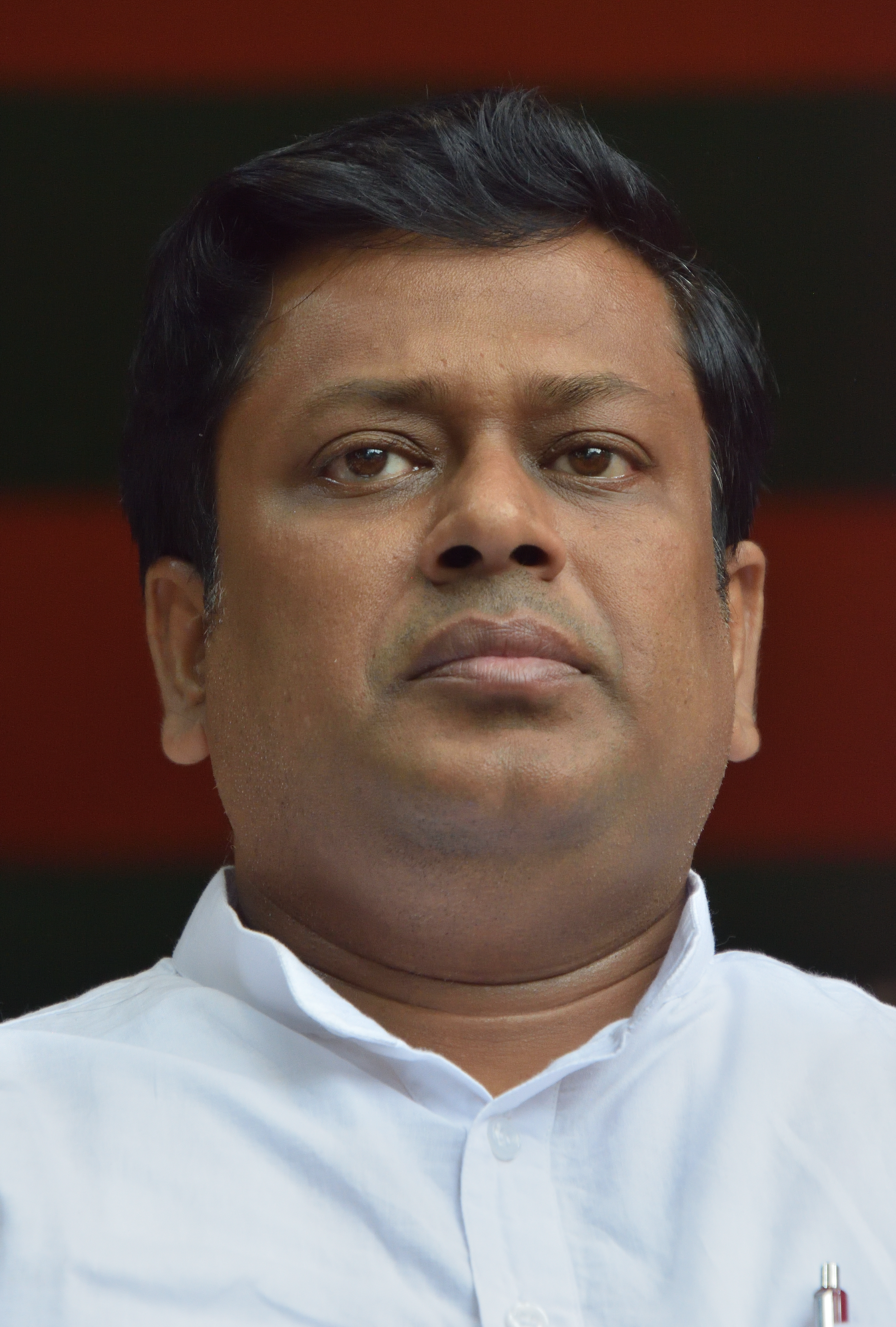
- Incumbent Sukanta Majumdar
- Party: BJP
- Alliance: NDA
- Elected year: 2024

Balurghat Lok Sabha constituency is one of the 543 parliamentary constituencies in India. The constituency centres on Balurghat in West Bengal. While six of the assembly segments of No. 6 Balurghat Lok Sabha constituency are in Dakshin Dinajpur district, one assembly segment is in Uttar Dinajpur district. The seat was earlier reserved for scheduled castes but from 2009 it is an open seat.

== Assembly segments ==
Parliamentary constituencies in West Bengal - 1. Cooch Behar, 2. Alipurduars, 3. Jalpaiguri, 4. Darjeeling, 5. Raiganj, 6. Balurghat, 7. Maldaha Uttar, 8. Maldaha Dakshin, 9. Jangipur, 10. Baharampur, 11. Murshidabad, 12. Krishnanagar, 13. Ranaghat, 14. Bangaon, 15. Barrackpore, 16. Dum Dum, 17. Barasat, 18. Basirhat, 19. Jaynagar, 20. Mathurapur, 21. Diamond Harbour, 22. Jadavpur, 23. Kolkata Dakshin, 24. Kolkata Uttar, 25. Howrah, 26. Uluberia, 27. Serampore, 28. Hooghly, 29. Arambagh, 30. Tamluk, 31, Kanthi, 32. Ghatal, 33. Jhargram, 34. Medinipur, 35. Purulia, 36. Bankura, 37. Bishnupur, 38. Bardhaman Purba, 39. Bardhaman Durgapur, 40. Asansol, 41. Bolpur, 42. Birbhum

As per order of the Delimitation Commission in respect of the delimitation of constituencies in the West Bengal, parliamentary constituency no. 6 Balurghat is composed of the following assembly segments from 2009:

| # | Name | District | Member | Party | 2024 Lead |
|---|---|---|---|---|---|
| 36 | Itahar | Uttar Dinajpur | Mosaraf Hussen | AITC | AITC |
| 37 | Kushmandi (SC) | Dakshin Dinajpur | Tapas Chandra Roy | BJP | AITC |
| 38 | Kumarganj | Dakshin Dinajpur | Toraf Hossain Mandal | AITC | AITC |
| 39 | Balurghat | Dakshin Dinajpur | Bidyut Roy | BJP | BJP |
| 40 | Tapan (ST) | Dakshin Dinajpur | Budhrai Tudu | BJP | BJP |
| 41 | Gangarampur (SC) | Dakshin Dinajpur | Satyendra Nath Ray | BJP | BJP |
| 42 | Harirampur | Dakshin Dinajpur | Biplab Mitra | AITC | AITC |

== Members of Parliament ==
| Year | Name | Party |
|---|---|---|
| 1952 | Susil Ranjan Chattopadhyay (Note: West Dinajpur (1952-62)) | Indian National Congress |
| 1957 | Selku Mardi | Indian National Congress |
| 1957 | Chapala Kanta Bhattacharjee | Indian National Congress |
| 1962 | Sarkar Murmu | Communist Party of India |
| 1967 | Jatindra Nath Pramanick | Indian National Congress |
| 1971 | Rasendranath Barman | Indian National Congress |
| 1977 | Palash Barman | Revolutionary Socialist Party |
| 1980 | Palash Barman | Revolutionary Socialist Party |
| 1984 | Palash Barman | Revolutionary Socialist Party |
| 1989 | Palash Barman | Revolutionary Socialist Party |
| 1991 | Palash Barman | Revolutionary Socialist Party |
| 1996 | Ranen Barman | Revolutionary Socialist Party |
| 1998 | Ranen Barman | Revolutionary Socialist Party |
| 1999 | Ranen Barman | Revolutionary Socialist Party |
| 2004 | Ranen Barman | Revolutionary Socialist Party |
| 2009 | Prasanta Kumar Majumdar | Revolutionary Socialist Party |
| 2014 | Arpita Ghosh | Trinamool Congress |
| 2019 | Sukanta Majumdar | Bharatiya Janata Party |
| 2024 | Sukanta Majumdar | Bharatiya Janata Party |

== Election results ==
Vote share of Winning candidates
| 2024 | 46.47% |
| 2019 | 45.02% |
| 2014 | 38.52% |
| 2009 | 44.38% |
| 2004 | 44.87% |
| 1999 | 44.67% |
| 1998 | 48.90% |
| 1996 | 49.02% |
| 1991 | 45.33% |
| 1989 | 49.42% |
| 1984 | 51.44% |
| 1980 | 55.78% |
| 1977 | 57.63% |
| 1971 | 47.58% |
| 1967 | 46.15% |
| 1962 | 51.85% |
| 1957 | 29.12% |
| 1957 | 26.18% |
| 1952 | 59.45% |

=== General election 2024 ===
2024 Indian general election: Balurghat
| Party | Candidate | Votes | % | ±% |
|---|---|---|---|---|
| BJP | Sukanta Majumdar | 574,996 | 46.47 | ▲1.45 |
| AITC | Biplab Mitra | 564,610 | 45.63 | ▲3.39 |
| RSP | Joydeb Siddhanta | 54,217 | 4.38 | ▼1.71 |
| NOTA | None of the above | 7,437 | 0.6 | ▼0.52 |
| Majority | | 10,386 | 0.84 | ▼1.94 |
| Turnout | | 12,35,347 (Note: does not include postal ballots) | 79.09 | ▼4.6 |
| BJP hold | | Swing | | |

=== 2019 ===
2019 Indian general election: Balurghat
| Party | Candidate | Votes | % | ±% |
|---|---|---|---|---|
| BJP | Sukanta Majumdar | 539,317 | 45.02 | |
| AITC | Arpita Ghosh | 506,024 | 42.24 | |
| RSP | Ranen Barman | 72,990 | 6.09 | |
| INC | Abdus Sadek Sarkar | 36,783 | 3.07 | |
| JMM | Naran Tudu | 6,387 | 0.53 | |
| NOTA | None of the Above | 13,414 | 1.12 | |
| Majority | | 33,293 | 2.78 | |
| Turnout | | | | |
| Swing to BJP from AITC | | Swing | | |

=== 2014 ===
2014 Indian general election: Balurghat
| Party | Candidate | Votes | % | ±% |
|---|---|---|---|---|
| AITC | Arpita Ghosh | 409,641 | 38.52 | |
| RSP | Bimalendu Sarkar | 302,677 | 28.46 | |
| BJP | Biswapriya Roy Choudhury | 223,014 | 20.97 | |
| INC | Om Prakas Mishra | 80,715 | 7.59 | |
| AIUDF | Abdus Sadek Sarkar | 10,547 | 0.99 | |
| BSP | Rajen Hansda | 4,581 | 0.43 | |
| SUCI(C) | Islam Nural | 2,644 | 0.25 | |
| CPIM | Manas Chakraborty | 1,466 | 0.14 | |
| BMP | Ranendranath Mali | 1,687 | 0.16 | |
| RaJSP | Sasti Chandra Sarkar | 3,969 | 0.37 | |
| JDP | Som Hemram | 4,774 | 0.45 | |
| IND | Siben Sarkar | 5,647 | 0.53 | |
| NOTA | None of the Above | 11,691 | 1.10 | |
| Majority | | 106,964 | 10.06 | |
| Turnout | | 1,063,053 | 84.74 | |
| Swing to AITC from RSP | | Swing | | |

=== 2009 ===
2009 Indian general election: Balurghat
| Party | Candidate | Votes | % | ±% |
|---|---|---|---|---|
| RSP | Prasanta Kumar Majumdar | 388,444 | 44.38 | |
| AITC | Biplab Mitra | 383,339 | 43.79 | |
| BJP | Subhash Chandra Barman | 59,741 | 6.82 | |
| BSP | Gobinda Hansda | 13,977 | 1.60 | |
| AIUDF | Ghosh Mridul | 10,460 | 1.19 | |
| JMM | Chamru Oram | 5,722 | 0.65 | |
| IND | Prahallad Barman | 5,495 | 0.63 | |
| IND | Samu Soren | 8,182 | 0.93 | |
| Majority | | 5,105 | 0.58 | |
| Turnout | | 875,360 | 86.65 | |
| RSP hold | | Swing | | |

=== 2004 ===
2004 Indian general election: Balurghat (SC)
| Party | Candidate | Votes | % | ±% |
|---|---|---|---|---|
| RSP | Ranen Barman | 415,298 | 44.87 | |
| BJP | Manomohan Ray | 344,152 | 37.18 | |
| INC | Dipti Barman | 119,104 | 12.87 | |
| IND | Binoy Mallick | 19,574 | 2.11 | |
| BSP | Gobinda Sakar | 17,230 | 1.86 | |
| IND | Prahallad Barman | 10,273 | 1.11 | |
| Majority | | 71,146 | 7.69 | |
| Turnout | | 925,631 | | |
| RSP hold | | Swing | | |

=== 1999 ===
1999 Indian general election: Balurghat (SC)
| Party | Candidate | Votes | % | ±% |
|---|---|---|---|---|
| RSP | Ranen Barman | 375,669 | 44.67 | |
| BJP | Subhash Ch. Barman | 312,748 | 37.19 | |
| INC | Bikash Barman | 143,034 | 17.01 | |
| IND | Gour Barman | 4,986 | 0.59 | |
| BSP | Biswanath Barman | 4,461 | 0.53 | |
| Majority | | 62,921 | 7.48 | |
| Turnout | | 851,433 | 76.88 | |
| RSP hold | | Swing | | |

=== 1998 ===
1998 Indian general election: Balurghat (SC)
| Party | Candidate | Votes | % | ±% |
|---|---|---|---|---|
| RSP | Ranen Barman | 428,710 | 48.90 | |
| AITC | Nani Gopal Roy | 256,535 | 29.26 | |
| INC | Mohini Mohan Roy | 182,846 | 20.86 | |
| BSP | Purna Chandra Sarkar | 3,888 | 0.44 | |
| IND | Dhirendra Nath Singh | 2,753 | 0.31 | |
| IND | Malin Chandra Barman | 1,251 | 0.14 | |
| IND | Niren Mondal | 662 | 0.08 | |
| Majority | | 172,175 | 19.64 | |
| Turnout | | 892,146 | 81.97 | |
| RSP hold | | Swing | | |

=== 1996 ===
1996 Indian general election: Balurghat (SC)
| Party | Candidate | Votes | % | ±% |
|---|---|---|---|---|
| RSP | Ranen Barman | 440,283 | 49.02 | |
| INC | Satyendra Nath Roy | 296,576 | 33.02 | |
| BJP | Man Mohan Roy | 145,257 | 16.17 | |
| IND | Gour Barman | 8,945 | 1.00 | |
| IND | Nripen Barman | 2,685 | 0.30 | |
| IND | Jatindra Nath Barman | 2,268 | 0.25 | |
| IND | Chittaranjan Barman | 2,193 | 0.24 | |
| Majority | | 143,707 | 16.00 | |
| Turnout | | 926,427 | 86.76 | |
| RSP hold | | Swing | | |

=== 1991 ===
1991 Indian general election: Balurghat (SC)
| Party | Candidate | Votes | % | ±% |
|---|---|---|---|---|
| RSP | Palas Barman | 353,159 | 45.33 | |
| INC | Rasendra Nath Barman | 267,078 | 34.28 | |
| BJP | Monomohan Roy | 147,544 | 18.94 | |
| IND | Gour Barman | 5,343 | 0.69 | |
| JP | Jaitindran Mohan Ray | 4,087 | 0.52 | |
| IND | Chattaranjan Barman | 1,955 | 0.25 | |
| Majority | | 86,081 | 11.05 | |
| Turnout | | 794,795 | 82.08 | |
| RSP hold | | Swing | | |

=== 1989 ===
1989 Indian general election: Balurghat (SC)
| Party | Candidate | Votes | % | ±% |
|---|---|---|---|---|
| RSP | Palas Barman | 388,103 | 49.42 | |
| INC | Satyendra Nath Roy | 354,577 | 45.15 | |
| BJP | Nripendra Barman | 39,412 | 5.02 | |
| AMB | Bhagirath Barman | 3,181 | 0.41 | |
| Majority | | 33,526 | 4.27 | |
| Turnout | | 795,507 | 83.85 | |
| RSP hold | | Swing | | |

=== 1984 ===
1984 Indian general election: Balurghat (SC)
| Party | Candidate | Votes | % | ±% |
|---|---|---|---|---|
| RSP | Palas Barman | 317,141 | 51.44 | |
| INC | Satyendra Nath Ray | 294,924 | 47.84 | |
| IND | Jayanta Saha | 4,465 | 0.72 | |
| Majority | | 22,217 | 3.60 | |
| Turnout | | 626,120 | 81.43 | |
| RSP hold | | Swing | | |

=== 1980 ===
1980 Indian general election: Balurghat (SC)
| Party | Candidate | Votes | % | ±% |
|---|---|---|---|---|
| RSP | Palas Barman | 284,766 | 55.78 | |
| INC(I) | Ranajit Sarkar | 204,438 | 40.05 | |
| JP | Sudhir Chandra Roy | 9,092 | 1.78 | |
| INC(U) | Khagendra Nath Roy | 8,664 | 1.70 | |
| IND | Narayan Chandra Sarkar | 3,546 | 0.69 | |
| Majority | | 80,328 | 15.73 | |
| Turnout | | 521,156 | 75.63 | |
| RSP hold | | Swing | | |

=== 1977 ===
1977 Indian general election: Balurghat (SC)
| Party | Candidate | Votes | % | ±% |
|---|---|---|---|---|
| RSP | Palas Barman | 206,112 | 57.63 | |
| INC | Rasendra Nath Burman | 151,549 | 42.37 | |
| Majority | | 54,563 | 15.26 | |
| Turnout | | 369,396 | 66.21 | |
| Swing to RSP from INC | | Swing | | |

=== 1971 ===
1971 Indian general election: Balurghat (SC)
| Party | Candidate | Votes | % | ±% |
|---|---|---|---|---|
| INC | Rasendra Nath Barman | 159,896 | 47.58 | |
| CPI(M) | Pijush Kanti Das | 74,618 | 22.20 | |
| RSP | Palash Barman | 54,612 | 16.25 | |
| CPI | Biswas Jiabin Krishna | 35,140 | 10.46 | |
| INC(O) | Jatindra Nath Pramanik | 11,784 | 3.51 | |
| Majority | | 85,278 | 25.38 | |
| Turnout | | 349,541 | 70.42 | |
| INC hold | | Swing | | |

=== 1967 ===
1967 Indian general election: Balurghat (SC)
| Party | Candidate | Votes | % | ±% |
|---|---|---|---|---|
| INC | Jatindra Nath Pramanick | 130,379 | 46.15 | |
| CPI(M) | D. P. Kanti | 106,930 | 37.85 | |
| IND | P. C. Sarkar | 25,649 | 9.08 | |
| IND | B. K. Barman | 19,558 | 6.92 | |
| Majority | | 23,449 | 8.30 | |
| Turnout | | 297,118 | 65.21 | |
| Swing to INC from CPI | | Swing | | |

=== 1962 ===
1962 Indian general election: Balurghat (ST)
| Party | Candidate | Votes | % | ±% |
|---|---|---|---|---|
| CPI | Sarkar Murmu | 137,290 | 51.85 | |
| INC | Shelku Mardi | 127,470 | 48.15 | |
| Majority | | 9,820 | 3.70 | |
| Turnout | | 275,027 | 57.75 | |
| CPI win (new seat) | | | | |

=== 1957 ===
1957 Indian general election: West Dinajpur (Two-member Constituency)
| Party | Candidate | Votes | % | ±% |
|---|---|---|---|---|
| INC | Selku Mardi | 177,194 | 29.12 | |
| INC | Chaplalkanta Bhattacharjee | 159,310 | 26.18 | |
| CPI | Narendra Mohan Sen | 127,067 | 20.88 | |
| PSP | Samuel | 114,731 | 18.86 | |
| IND | Kishorilal Kundu | 30,158 | 4.96 | |
| Majority | | 32,243 | 5.30 | |
| Turnout | | 608,460 | 41.28 | |
| INC hold | | Swing | | |

=== 1952 ===
1952 Indian general election: West Dinajpur
| Party | Candidate | Votes | % | ±% |
|---|---|---|---|---|
| INC | Susil Ranjan Chattopadhyay | 88,815 | 59.45 | |
| CPI | Narendra Mohan Sen | 60,583 | 40.55 | |
| Majority | | 28,232 | 18.90 | |
| Turnout | | 149,398 | 40.88 | |
| INC win (new seat) | | | | |

Note: In 1951 and 1957 the contest was in the West Dinajpur constituency. From 1962, it was Balurghat constituency.

== See also ==
- Balurghat
- List of constituencies of the Lok Sabha
