= Rasendra Nath Barman =

Indian politician

Member of Parliament, Lok Sabha
- In office 1971-1977
- Preceded by: J.N. Pramanick
- Succeeded by: Palash Barman
- Constituency: Balurghat, West Bengal

Personal details
- Born: 1936 (age 89–90) Arjunpur, West Dinajpur district, Bengal Presidency, British India
- Party: Indian National Congress
- Spouse: Gangarani Barman

Rasendra Nath Barman is an Indian politician. He was elected to the Lok Sabha, lower house of the Parliament of India from Balurghat, West Bengal as a member of the Indian National Congress.
