= Arpita Ghosh =

Indian theatre artist and politician

Member of Parliament, Rajya Sabha
- In office 3 April 2020 – 15 September 2021
- Constituency: West Bengal

Member of Parliament, Lok Sabha
- In office 16 May 2014 – 23 May 2019
- Preceded by: Prasanta Kumar Majumdar
- Succeeded by: Sukanta Majumder
- Constituency: Balurghat

State General Secretary, All India Trinamool Congress
- In office 2021–2024

Personal details
- Born: 10 July 1966 (age 60) Kolkata, West Bengal, India
- Party: All India Trinamool Congress
- Education: University of Calcutta (B.Sc.)
- Profession: Artist
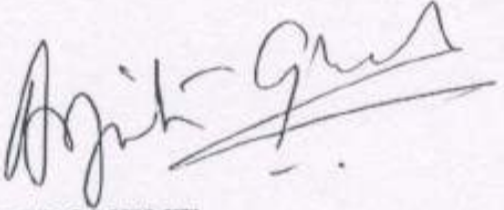
- Signature

Arpita Ghosh, is an Indian theatre artist and politician who serves as a Member of Parliament, Rajya Sabha from West Bengal. She has served as the Member of Parliament of the 16th Lok Sabha for Balurghat (Lok Sabha constituency), West Bengal. She won the 2014 Indian general election being an All India Trinamool Congress candidate.

A theatre director, actor and playwright turned politician, she graduated B.Sc. from the Scottish Church College at the University of Calcutta.

== Career ==
Arpita Ghosh began her career in the theater in 1998 at age 31. She acted and directed throughout the early 2000s.

=== Early life and theatre journey ===
- Arpita Ghosh joined theatre at the end of 1998. She started working in a group named ‘Fourth Wall’ for more than a year and acted in two major plays of the group.
- In January 2000 she joined Pancham Ved Charjashram as a student of theatre. After completing the course of 1 year, she started working with Pancham Vaidic.

=== Pancham Vaidic activities ===
- In 2003 Arpita first directed a children's play named ‘Ha Ja Ba Ra La’, based on a story by Sukumar Ray, dramatised by herself.
- In 2003 only she also directed a small play named ‘Antargata Aagun’ written by Tirthankar Chanda.
- In 2004 she translated ‘Crime Passionnel’, a play by Jean Paul Sartre which was directed by Saoli Mitra, where she acted as the lead female character. This play was later staged in Bharat Rang Mahotsav in 2010.
- In 2005 she directed two plays named ‘Lankadahan Pala’, by Lila Majumdar and ‘Ghater Katha’, by Rabindranath Tagore. She revived the latter play in 2014 in a different form.
- In 2005 Pancham Vaidic produced its play ‘Chandaali’, a dramatised version of Chandaalika by Rabindranath Tagore, directed by Saoli Mitra, where she played the role of Prakriti, the central character. Pancham Vaidic staged this play in Bharat Rang Mahotsav in 2005.
- In 2006 Arpita translated, dramatised & directed ‘Animal Farm’, a novel by George Orwell. The Bengali play was named ‘Poshukhamar’. The play became very popular in West Bengal.
- In 2007 Arpita got the invitation from “Airtel-Mukhomukhi Young Director’s Festival” held in Kolkata, where she staged a play named ‘Tokolosh’, translated, dramatised & directed by her. It is a translated version of Ronald Segal's popular novel ‘Tokolosh’.
- In 2008 Pancham Vaidic staged a new play on 22 August named ‘Narokiyo’, written & directed by Arpita Ghosh where she talked about anti-violence. The play was revived again in 2013.
- In 2009 Pancham Vaidic staged a new play on 24 May, named ‘A-parajita’, (compilation of 3 short stories by Tagore) dramatised & directed by Arpita Ghosh.
- In 2010 Pancham Vaidic staged a new play on 22 August, named ‘Ghare-Baire’, (based on Tagore's novel in the same name) dramatised & directed by Arpita Ghosh.
- In 2011 Pancham Vaidic staged a play named ‘Ebong Debjani’ (based on an episode in Mahabharata) dramatised & directed by Arpita Ghosh. She also acted in a lead role.
- In 2012 Pancham Vaidic staged the play ‘Achalayatan’ – a play by Gurudev Rabindranath Tagore, directed and acted by Arpita Ghosh
- In 2013 Pancham Vaidic staged ‘Astomito Madhyanha’ – a play based on Arthur Koestler’s “Darkness at Noon” – adapted, translated, dramatised & directed by Arpita Ghosh
- In 2013, Arpita also did her first solo acting in Pancham Vaidic’s production ‘Streer Potro’ written by Gurudev Rabindranath Tagore, dramatized and directed by Arpita herself.
- In 2014, Arpita directed Pancham Vaidic's production “Duto Din” – play written by Bratya Basu. Arpita also acted in a leading role in the production.
- In 2015, Arpita adapted, scripted and directed the latest production of Pancham Vaidic “Karubasana” – based on late poet Jibanananda Das’s novel in the same name. The play was first staged in August 2015.

=== Acting in other groups ===
- In 2013 Arpita directed the play ‘Kharir Tir’ – produced by Naihati Samay 1400 where she also acted in the lead role.
- In 2014 Arpita did her second solo acting in Bratya Basu's lyrical drama ‘Apatoto Eibhabe Dujoner Dekha Hoye Thake’ – directed by Debesh Chattopadhyay and produced by Sansriti, Kolkata

== Translations & adaptations ==
- Crime Passionnel, a play by Jean Paul Sartre (2004) into "Rajnaitik Hatya?"
- Animal Farm, novel by George Orwell (2006) into "Poshu Khamar"
- Tokolosh, a play by Ronald Segal (2007) into "Tokolosh"
- Darkness at noon, novel by Arthur Koestler (2013) into "Astomito Madhyanha"

== Awards ==
- "Satya Bandyopadhyay Smriti Purashkar" for the year 2005 as Best Actress for award for her work in “Rajnaitik Hatya?”
- “Shyamal Sen Smriti Purashkar” for her contribution as Director and Actress in 2007.

== Plays directed ==
- Ha-Ja-Ba-Ra-La, (2003)
- Antargata Agun, (2003).
- Lanka Dahan Pala, (2004)
- Ghater Katha, (2004)
- Poshu Khamar, (2006)
- Tokolosh, (2007)
- Narokiyo, (2008)
- A-Parajita, (2009)
- Ghare Baire, (2010)
- Ebong Debjani, (2011)
- Astomito Madhyanha, (2012)
- Achalayatan, (2013)
- Streer Potro, (2013)
- Kharir Tir, (2013)
- Duto Din, (2014)
- Karubasana, (2015)
- Machi, (2017)

== See also ==
- Bratya Basu
- Debesh Chattopadhyay
- Suman Mukhopadhyay
- Kaushik Sen
- Sujan Mukhopadhyay
