= Gangarampur =

- City
- Location in West Bengal, India Gangarampur (India)
- Coordinates: 25.4°N 88.52°E
- Country: India
- State: West Bengal
- District: Dakshin Dinajpur

Government
  - Type: Municipality
  - Body: Gangarampur Municipality
  - Chairman: Prasanta Mitra
  - Member of Legislative Assembly: Satyendra Nath Ray
  - Member of Parliament: Sukanta Majumdar, Union Minister of State for MoE and MoDoNER

Area
  - Total: 10.29 km^{2} (3.97 sq mi)
- Elevation: 25 m (82 ft)

Population (2011)
  - Total: 56,175
  - Density: 5,459/km^{2} (14,140/sq mi)

Languages
  - Official: Bengali, English
- Time zone: UTC+5:30 (IST)
- PIN: 733124
- Telephone code: 03521
- Vehicle registration: WB61 - WB62
- Lok Sabha constituency: Balurghat
- Vidhan Sabha constituency: Gangarampur
- Website: Official website

Gangarampur is one of the cities and a municipality in Dakshin Dinajpur district in the state of West Bengal, India. Balurghat is the headquarters of the Gangarampur Subdivision. The city is located on the bank of river Punarbhaba. Gangarampur is one of the major cities connected through National Highway 512. It became the subdivision of newly formed district Dakshin Dinajpur when Paschim Dinajpur was bifurcated into Uttar and Dakshin Dinajpur in 1992. It was one of the Khalji capital under Muhammad Khalji.

== Geography ==
Cities and towns in the Dakshin Dinajpur district
M: municipal city/ town, CT: census town, R: rural/ urban centre, H: historical site
Owing to space constraints in the small map, the actual locations in a larger map may vary slightly

=== Location ===
Gangarampur is located almost in the middle of Dakshin Dinajpur district at 25.4°N 88.52°E. It has spread linearly along the banks of the Punarbhaba River. It has an average elevation of 25 metres (82 feet). The area of the city is 10.29 Sq. km.

In the map alongside, all places marked on the map are linked in the full screen version.

== Climate ==
Gangarampur has a Tropical wet-and-dry climate, with summer monsoons. The maximum temperatures can often exceed 38 °C (100 °F) during May–June. Winter tends to last from December to early-February, with the lowest temperatures hovering in the 4 °C (40 °F) to 8 °C (47 °F) range during December and January. Monsoon is the most notable phenomenon in the climate of the city. Maximum rainfall occurs during the monsoon in July–August.

Climate data for Gangarampur, India
Month	Jan	Feb	Mar	Apr	May	Jun	Jul	Aug	Sep	Oct	Nov	Dec	Year
Mean daily maximum °C (°F)	24 (76)	28 (82)	33 (92)	37 (98)	36 (97)	34 (94)	33 (91)	32 (90)	33 (91)	32 (89)	29 (84)	26 (79)	32 (89)
Mean daily minimum °C (°F)	11 (52)	13 (56)	18 (64)	22 (72)	24 (76)	26 (78)	26 (79)	26 (78)	26 (78)	23 (73)	17 (63)	13 (55)	20 (68)
Average precipitation mm (inches)	13 (0.5)	10 (0.4)	15 (0.6)	43 (1.7)	120 (4.8)	520 (20.3)	620 (24.4)	560 (22.2)	240 (9.5)	99 (3.9)	10 (0.4)	2.5 (0.1)	2,260 (88.8)
Source: Weatherbase

== Demographics ==
As of 2011 India census, Gangarampur had a population of 56,175. Males constitute 52% of the population and females 48%. Gangarampur has an average literacy rate of 77%, higher than the national average of 74%: male literacy is 84%, and female literacy is 70%. In Gangarampur, 13% of the population is under 6 years of age.

Historic population

1991	31,177
2001	53,533
2011	56,175

== Education ==
=== Colleges ===
There are many colleges in the city limits:

- Gangarampur B.Ed College
- Gangarampur College
- Gangarampur Government Polytechnic
- Vidyasagar College of Education
- Vidyasagar Primary Teachers Training Institute

=== Schools ===
There are many public and private schools in the city limits:

- Kadihat Belbari High School
- Chittaranjan English Medium School
- Gangarampur Girls' High School
- Gangarampur High School
- Holy Cross Primary School
- Holy Cross Girls High School
- Indranarayanpur Colony High School
- Jamir Smriti Public Mission School
- Kabitirtha Bangla Academy
- Kalitala Vidyasagar Shishu Niketan
- Kids Hall
- Niranjan Ghosh Smriti Vidyapith
- Orient National School
- Promod Dasgupta Smrity Vidyapith
- Rabrindra Smriti Vidyapith
- St. Joseph High School
- St. Pauls School
- Samput School of Classical Dance
- Saraswati Shishu Mandir, Gangarampur
- Shemrock Disha Play School
- Ujjwal Kids World

== Economy ==
The economy of Gangarampur is driven by agricultural farming, small business, handloom and handloom based handicrafts. Important handloom potential areas are located in Boaldaha, Korial, Belberi-I, Belberi-II and various parts in Gangarampur Municipality area. Important handloom products include cotton ordinary saree, cotton Mala saree, ladies churidar set (churidars are tightly fitting trousers worn by both men and women in South Asia), gents kurta/panjabi and Shirting Than (Length of cloth) etc. According to the annual report published by Directorate of Textiles (Govt. of West Bengal) Bordangi (located near Gangarampur College) area has 588, where as rest of Gangarampur area has 252 looms.

== Transportation ==
Gangarampur is connected to Kolkata, Siliguri, Jalpaiguri, Malda, Balurghat, Kishanganj, Cooch Behar, Bardhaman, Asansol, Raiganj, Durgapur, Nadia, and other major places in West Bengal and Bihar by both bus and train services.

=== Bus ===
The only State highway passes through Gangarampur is State Highway 10 (West Bengal). The state highway has recently been upgraded into National Highway 512 (India) by Government of India. This highway connects Gangarampur with National Highway 12 (India), which is the only other National Highway in Dakshin Dinajpur. This newly upgraded 96 kilometers long National Highway is stretched from Gazole to Hilli (near Indo/Bangladesh). Both private and public night bus services to Kolkata, Siliguri, Jalpaiguri, Cooch Behar are available. Buses to Balurghat, Raiganj and Malda run frequently throughout the day. Recently the New Bus Terminal near the old one was inaugurated.

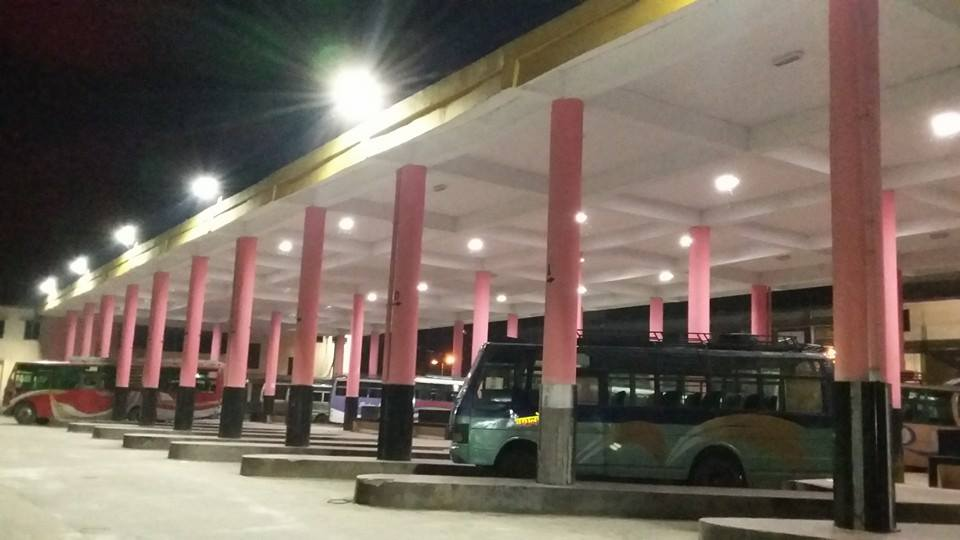
Gangarampur New Bus Terminal

=== Train ===
Gangarampur Railway Station was built earlier in 2004 and the first train ran on 30 December 2004. The station is located at the south side of the city near Gangarampur College. Few express trains like Howrah–Balurghat Express, Tebhaga Express(Balurghat-Kolkata), Gour Express(Balurghat-Sealdah), Balurghat-Siliguri Intercity Express stops at Gangarampur Railway Station.

Gangarampur railway station

== Health ==
The subdivisional hospital is located at the eastern side of the city near Kaldighi. The hospital runs with 250 beds. For improvement of overall health care services in Dakshin Dinajpur district many intervention-specific projects/programmes like improvement of infrastructural facilities in the secondary level hospitals, reducing the prevalence of Malaria, creating awareness about HIV, to look after the reproductive and child health of the below poverty line people in the municipal areas, providing free treatment/medicine to them etc. are taken under consideration. Gangarampur Super Speciality Hospital is now #2 Hospital in Dakshin Dinajpur district. Balurghat superspeciality hospital has 10 floor.#1. Balurghat district hospital is just 35 km from Gangarampur. Gangarampur Ghosh Medical Hall & Ghosh Sonoscan Centre is one of the best & reputed pharmaceutical store & leading healthcare centre among the whole district.

== Sports ==
The favourite sports in Gangarampur are cricket and football like other parts of West Bengal. As in the rest of India, cricket is popular in Gangarampur and is played on grounds and in streets throughout the city. The Football Club ground, a vast field that serves as the city's largest park, hosts several minor football and cricket games.

Gangarampur Stadium is located by the national highway (NH 512) near Kaldighi. The stadium was built in early twenty first century.

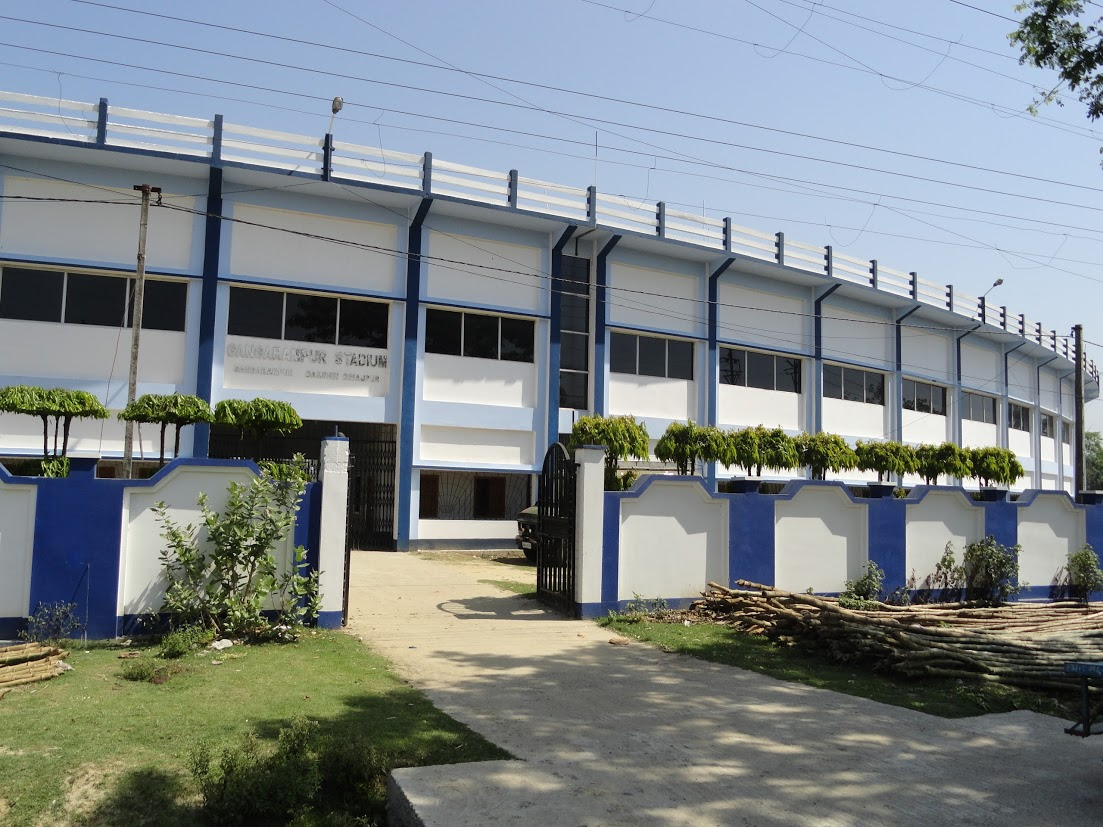
Gangarampur Stadium

Balurghat DSA is just 35 km from gangarampur

== Language ==
Bengali is the main language of Gangarampur. The principal communities are Hindus and Muslims, constituting the major portion of the population. There are many temples, mosques and churches around the city for religious practice.

== Attractions ==
=== Bangarh ===
Bangarh is the site of an archaeological dig, where work commenced in 1938 on uncovering remains of structures dating from the pre-Maurya Empire (326 BCE–180 BCE) to the Pala Empire (8th to 12th century).

=== Kaldighi ===
Kaldighi Lake and Dhaldighi Lake, located at the east side of the city, are home to migratory birds and freshwater fish. The lakes are a tourist attraction as well as a source of revenue for local fishermen.

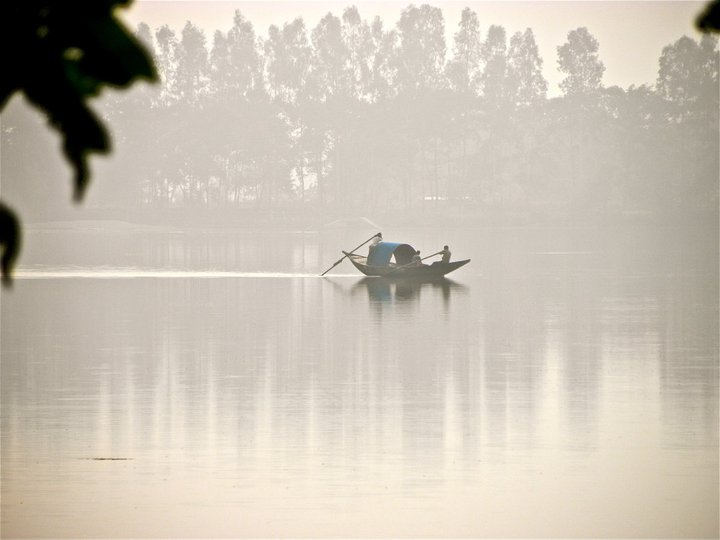
Fishermen catching fish in Kaldighi

=== Dargah of Shah Ata ===
The building was probably constructed in the 14th century. The building is a brick and stone mausoleum, the burial site of Mollah Atar-Uddin or Shah Ata.

=== Parks ===
There are three main parks in the area, Kalitala Children Park, Kaldighi Park and Gangarampur Shishu Udyan

Kalitala Children Park, Gangarampur

The first of these, Kalitala Children Park (Bengali: কালিতলা শিশু উদ্যান) is owned by Gangarampur Municipality, and is located at National Highway 512 and adjacent with Punarbhaba River in Gangarampur city.

=== Movie theater ===
There are two movie theaters showing Bengali and Hindi movies.

== See also ==
- Gangarampur Railway Station
- Bangarh
- Gangarampur Government Polytechnic
- Kaldighi
- Gangarampur Stadium
