= 1962 West Bengal Legislative Assembly election =

Assembly Election of West Bengal, India

1962 West Bengal state assembly election
- 8 May 1962

All 252 seats in the West Bengal state assembly 127 seats needed for a majority

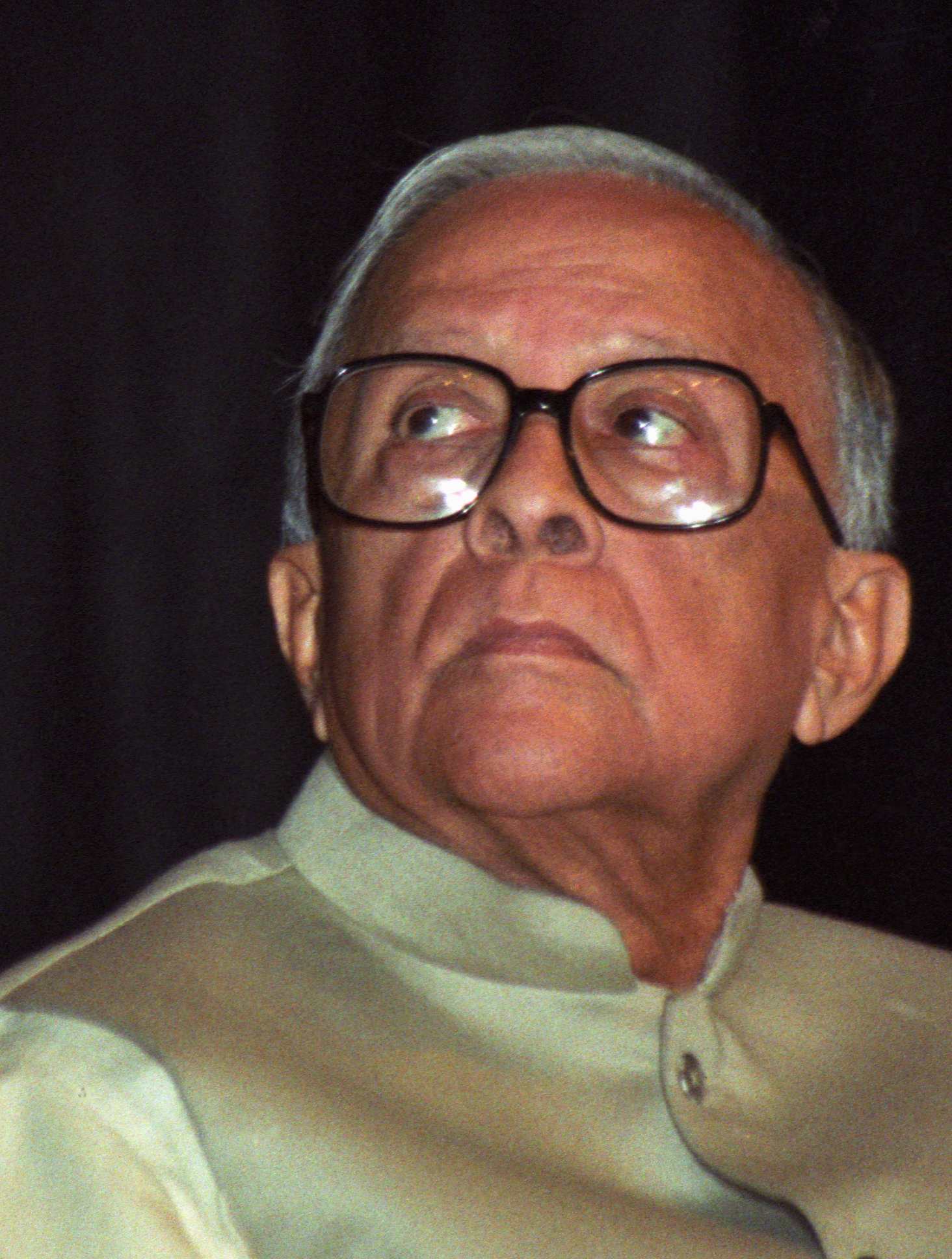
	First party	Second party
Leader	Prafulla Chandra Sen	Jyoti Basu
Party	INC	CPI
Leader since	1962	1952
Leader's seat	Arambag	Baranagar
Last election	46.14%, 152 seats	17.8%, 46 seats
Seats won	157	50
Seat change	▲5	▲4
Popular vote	4,522,476	2,386,834
Percentage	47.3%	25%
Swing	▲1.15 pp	▼8.64 pp
- Structure of the West Bengal Legislative Assembly after the election
Chief Minister before election
Bidhan Chandra Roy
INC
Chief Minister after election
Prafulla Chandra Sen
INC

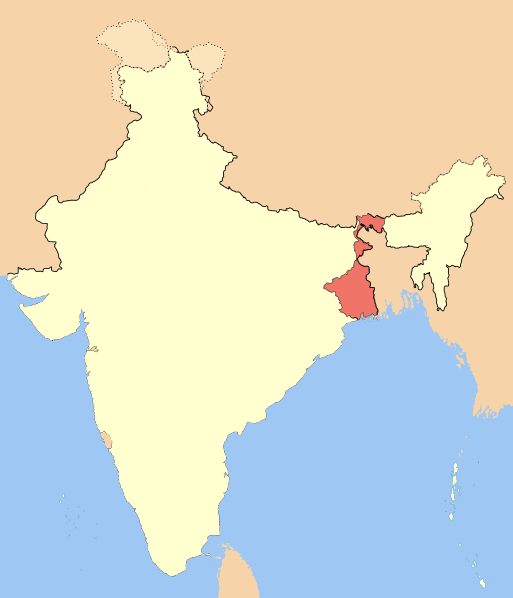
West Bengal, India

Legislative Assembly elections were held in the Indian state of West Bengal in 1962.

== Parties ==
Ahead of the polls, the Communist Party of India, the All India Forward Bloc, the Marxist Forward Bloc, the Revolutionary Communist Party of India, the Bolshevik Party of India and the Revolutionary Socialist Party had formed the electoral alliance United Left Front.

== Results ==
Party	Candidates	Seats	Votes	Vote %
Indian National Congress	252	157	4,522,476	47.29%
Communist Party of India	145	50	2,386,834	24.96%
Praja Socialist Party	87	5	477,254	4.99%
All India Forward Bloc	34	13	441,098	4.06%
Revolutionary Socialist Party	17	9	245,261	2.56%
Akhil Bharatiya Hindu Mahasabha	25	0	76,138	0.80%
Socialist Unity Centre of India	11	0	69,844	0.73%
Lok Sewak Sangh	11	4	68,583	0.72%
Sanjukta Biplabi Parisha	16	1	58,806	0.62%
Swatantra Party	24	0	55,447	0.58%
Bharatiya Jana Sangh	25	0	43,483	0.45%
All India Gorkha League	4	2	38,076	0.40%
Workers Party of India	8	0	26,913	0.24%
Socialist Party	7	0	2,663	0.03%
Independent	295	11	1,050,515	10.98%
Total	935	252	10,469,803	-

== Elected members ==
Constituency	Reserved for (SC/ST/None)	Member	Party
Makliganj	None	Amarendra Nath Roy Prohan	All India Forward Bloc
Mathabhanga	SC	Mahendra Nath Dakua	Indian National Congress
Sital Kuchi	SC	Bejoy Kumar Roy	All India Forward Bloc
Dinhata	None	Kamal Kanti Guha	All India Forward Bloc
Cooch Behar South	SC	Sunil Basunia	All India Forward Bloc
Cooch Behar North	None	Sunil Das Gupta	All India Forward Bloc
Tufanganj	None	Jiban Krishna Dey	Communist Party of India
Alipur Duars	None	Pijush Kanti Mukherjee	Indian National Congress
Kalchini	None	Nani Bhattacharjee	Revolutionary Socialist Party
Madarihat	ST	A. H. Beshterwitch	Revolutionary Socialist Party
Falakata	None	Hiralal Singha	Indian National Congress
Mainaguri	SC	Kamini Mohan Roy	Indian National Congress
Kharia	SC	Bhupendra Deb Raikut	Indian National Congress
Jalpaiguri	None	Khagendra Nath Das Gupta	Indian National Congress
Nagrakata	ST	Budhu Bhagat	Indian National Congress
Mal	None	Barendra Krishna Bhowmik	Indian National Congress
Kalimpong	None	Lakshmi Ranjan Josse	All India Gorkha League
Darjeeling	None	Deo Prakash Rai	All India Gorkha League
Jore Bungalow	None	Bhadra Bahadur Hamal	Communist Party of India
Siliguri	None	Jagadish Chandra Bhattacharjee	Indian National Congress
Phansidewa	ST	Tenzing Wangdi	Indian National Congress
Chopra	None	Mohammad Afaque Choudhury	Indian National Congress
Goalpokhar	None	Mohammad Hayat Ali	Praja Socialist Party
Karandighi	None	Phanis Chandra Sinha	Indian National Congress
Raiganj	None	Ramendra Nath Dutta	Indian National Congress
Kaliaganj	SC	Syama Prasad Barman	Indian National Congress
Kushmandi	None	Khalil Sayed	Communist Party of India
Gangarampur	ST	Mangla Kisku	Communist Party of India
Balurghat	None	Susil Ranjan Chattopadhyay	Indian National Congress
Tapan	ST	Nathaniel Murmu	Revolutionary Socialist Party
Itahar	None	Joynal Abedin	Indian National Congress
Habibpur S N	None	Nimai Chand Murmu	Communist Party of India
Malda	None	Dharanidhar Sarkar	Communist Party of India
Kharba	None	Golam Yazdani	Independent
Harischandrapur	None	Birendra Kumar Moitra	Indian National Congress
Ratua	SC	Dhaneswar Saha	Indian National Congress
Manikchak	None	Sowrindra Mohan Misra	Indian National Congress
Englishbazar	None	Santigopal Sen	Indian National Congress
Sujapur	None	Ashadulla Choudhury	Indian National Congress
Kaliachak	None	Promode Ranjan Bose	Independent
Farakka	None	Mohamad Giasuddin	Indian National Congress
Suti	None	Lutfal Hoque	Indian National Congress
Jangipur	None	Muktipada Chatterjee	Indian National Congress
Sagardighi	SC	Ambika Charan Das	Indian National Congress
Lalgola	None	Syed Kazim Ali Mirza	Indian National Congress
Bhagawangola	None	Sailendra Nath Adhikary	Praja Socialist Party
Raninagar	None	Syed Badrudduja	Independent
Murshidabad	None	Birendra Narayan Ray	Independent
Khargram	SC	Abhayapada Saha	Revolutionary Socialist Party
Kandi	None	Kumar Jagdish Chandra Sinha	Indian National Congress
Bharatpur	None	Shambhu Gopal Das	Revolutionary Socialist Party
Beldanga	None	Debsaran Ghosh	Revolutionary Socialist Party
Naoda	None	Mohammad Israil	Indian National Congress
Berhampore	None	Sanat Kumar Raha	Communist Party of India
Hariharpara	None	Abdul Latif	Indian National Congress
Jalangi	None	Abdul Bari Moktar	Independent
Karimpur	None	Samarajit Bandyopadhyay	Indian National Congress
Tehatta	None	Sankardas Bandyopadhyay	Indian National Congress
Nakashipara	None	S. M. Fazlur Rahman	Indian National Congress
Chapra	SC	Mohananda Haldar	Sanjukta Biplabi Parisha
Krishnagar	None	Kashi Kanta Maitra	Praja Socialist Party
Nabadwip	None	Debi Prasad Basu	Communist Party of India
Santipur	None	Kanai Pal	Independent
Hanskhali	SC	Pramitha Ranjan Thakur	Indian National Congress
Ranaghat	None	Gour Chandra Kundu	Communist Party of India
Chakdah	None	Santi Das	Indian National Congress
Haringhata	None	Narendra Nath Sarker	Indian National Congress
Bagdah	SC	Manindra Bhusan Biswas	Indian National Congress
Bongaon	None	Jiban Ratan Dhar	Indian National Congress
Habra	None	Tarun Kanti Ghose	Indian National Congress
Barasat	None	Asoke Krishna Dutta	Indian National Congress
Bijpur	None	Monoranjan Roy	Communist Party of India
Naihati	None	Gopal Basu	Communist Party of India
Bhatpara	None	Dayaram Begi	Indian National Congress
Noapara	None	Jamini Bhusha Saha	Communist Party of India
Titagarh	None	Krishna Kumar Shukla	Indian National Congress
Khardah	None	Gopal Banerjee	Communist Party of India
Baranagar	None	Jyoti Basu	Communist Party of India
Dum Dum	None	Tarun Kumar Sen Gupta	Communist Party of India
Rajarhat	SC	Pranab Prasad Roy	Indian National Congress
Deganga	None	Maulana Bazlur Rahaman Dargapuri	Indian National Congress
Swarupnagar	None	Abdul Gafur	Indian National Congress
Baduria	None	Md. Ziaul Haque	Indian National Congress
Basirhat	None	Bijesh Chandra Sen	Indian National Congress
Hasnabad	None	Dinabandhu Das	Indian National Congress
Sandeshkhali	SC	Ananta Kumar Baidya	Indian National Congress
Kalinagar	SC	Rajkrishna Mondal	Indian National Congress
Haroa	None	Jehangir Kabir	Indian National Congress
Bhangar	None	A. K. M. Isahaque	Indian National Congress
Basanti	None	Shakila Khatun	Indian National Congress
Canning	SC	Khagendra Nath Naskar	Indian National Congress
Joynagar North	None	Jnantosh Chakravarti	Indian National Congress
Joynagar South	SC	Anadi Mohan Tanti	Indian National Congress
Mathurapur South East	None	Bhusan Chandra Das	Indian National Congress
Kakdwip	None	Maya Banerjee	Indian National Congress
Mathurapur North West	None	(sc) Brindaban Gayen	Indian National Congress
Kulpi	None	Hrishikesh Halder	Independent
Diamond Harbour	None	Jagdish Chandra Halder	Indian National Congress
Falta	None	Khagendra Nath Das	Indian National Congress
Magrahat West	None	Abul Hashem	Indian National Congress
Magrahat East	SC	Ardhendu Sekhar Naskar	Indian National Congress
Baruipur	SC	Sakti Kumar Sarkar	Indian National Congress
Sonarpur	None	Khagendra Kumar Roy Chowdhary	Communist Party of India
Bishnupur East	SC	Santilata Mondal	Indian National Congress
Bishnupur West	None	Jugal Charan Santra	Indian National Congress
Budge Budge	None	Haralal Haldar	Indian National Congress
Maheshtola	None	Ahammad Ali Mufti	Indian National Congress
Behala	None	Rabindra Nath Mukhopadhyay	Communist Party of India
Garden Reach	None	S. M. Abdullah	Indian National Congress
Fort	None	Maitreyee Bose	Indian National Congress
Ekbalpore	None	Narendra Nath Sen	Indian National Congress
Alipore	None	Somnath Lahiri	Communist Party of India
Kalighat	None	Beva Mitra	Indian National Congress
Chowringhee	None	Bidhan Chandra Roy	Indian National Congress
Bhowanipur	None	Siddhartha Shankar Ray	Independent
Rashbehari Avenue	None	Bejoy Kumar Banerjee	Independent
Tollygunge	None	Niranjan Sengupta	Communist Party of India
Ballygunge	None	Anil Maitra	Indian National Congress
Beliaghata South	SC	Gonesh Prosad Roy	Indian National Congress
Beliaghata North	None	Jagat Basu	Communist Party of India
Manicktola	None	Ila Mitra	Communist Party of India
Belgachia	None	Ganesh Ghosh	Communist Party of India
Burtola North	None	Nikil Das	Revolutionary Socialist Party
Sukeas Street	None	Keshab Chandra Basu	Indian National Congress
Entally	None	Abu Asad Mohammed Obaidul Ghani	Communist Party of India
Taltola	None	Karam Hossain	Indian National Congress
Vidyasagar	None	Narayan Chandra Roy	Communist Party of India
Muchipara	None	Pratap Chandra Chunder	Indian National Congress
Bow Bazar	None	Bijoy Singh Nahar	Indian National Congress
Bara Bazar	None	Ishawar Das Jalan	Indian National Congress
Burtola South	None	Amarendra Nath Basu	Communist Party of India
Jorsanko	None	Badri Prasad Poddar	Indian National Congress
Jorabagan	None	Napal Ch, Roy	Indian National Congress
Shampukur	None	Hemanta Kumar Basu	All India Forward Bloc
Cossipur	None	Sunil Kumar Das Gupta	Indian National Congress
Howrah East	None	Bejoy Bhattacharya	Indian National Congress
Howrah South	None	Kanai Lal Bhattacharya	All India Forward Bloc
Howrah West	None	Anadi Dass	Independent
Howrah North	None	Saila Mukerjee	Indian National Congress
Bally	None	Shahkar Lal Mukharjee	Indian National Congress
Domjur	None	Tara Pada Dey	Communist Party of India
Jagatballavpur	None	Satyanarayan Khan	Indian National Congress
Panchla	None	Apurba Lal Majumdar	All India Forward Bloc
Sankrail	SC	Dulal Chandra Mondal	Communist Party of India
Uluberia North	SC	Bejoy Bhusan Mondal	All India Forward Bloc
Uluberia South	None	Abani Kumar Basu	Indian National Congress
Syampur	None	Muraari Mohan Manya	Indian National Congress
Bagnan	None	Ranjit Kimar Ghosh Choudhury	Indian National Congress
Udaynarayanpur	None	Arabinda Roy	Indian National Congress
Amta	None	Tarapada Pramanik	Indian National Congress
Jangipara	SC	Biswanath Saha	Indian National Congress
Chanditala	None	Kanai Lall Dey	Indian National Congress
Uttarpara	None	Monoranjan Hazra	Communist Party of India
Serampore	None	Panchu Gopal Bhaduri	Communist Party of India
Bhadreswar	None	Girija Bhusan Mukherjee	Communist Party of India
Singur	None	Probhakar Pal	Indian National Congress
Chandernagore	None	Bhabani Mukhapadhyay	Communist Party of India
Chinsurah	None	Sambhu Charan Ghose	All India Forward Bloc
Balagarh	None	Brindaban Chattopadhyya	Indian National Congress
Pandua	SC	Radha Nath Das	Indian National Congress
Dhaniakhali	None	Birendra Chaudhury	Indian National Congress
Tarakeswar	None	Parbati Charan Hazra	Indian National Congress
Khanakul	SC	Krishna Pada Pandit	Indian National Congress
Arambagh East	None	Prafulla Chandra Sen	Indian National Congress
Arambagh West	None	Radha Krishna Pal	Indian National Congress
Chandrakona	None	Indrajit Roy	Indian National Congress
Ghatal	SC	Nagen Dolai	Communist Party of India
Daspur	None	Mrigendra Bhattachariyya	Communist Party of India
Panskura West	None	Syamadas Bhattachiryya	Indian National Congress
Panskura East	None	Rajani Kanta Pramanik	Indian National Congress
Tamluk	None	Ajoy Kumar Mukherjee	Indian National Congress
Mayna	None	Ananga Mohan Das	Indian National Congress
Mahishadal	None	Sushil Kumar Dhara	Indian National Congress
Sutahata	SC	Mahatab Chand Das	Indian National Congress
Nandigram South	None	Prabir Chandra Jana	Indian National Congress
Nandigram North	None	Subodh Chandra Maiti	Indian National Congress
Bhagabanpur	None	Abha Maiti	Indian National Congress
Khajuri	SC	Abanti Kumar Das	Indian National Congress
Contai North	None	Bejoy Krishna Maity	Indian National Congress
Contai South	None	Sudhir Chandra Das	Praja Socialist Party
Ramnagar	None	Balailal Das Mahapatra	Praja Socialist Party
Egra	None	Hrishikeh Chakraborty	Indian National Congress
Pataspur	None	Radha Nath Dasadhikari	Indian National Congress
Dantan	None	Charu Chandra Mahanti	Indian National Congress
Narayangarh	SC	Krishna Prasad Mandal	Indian National Congress
Sabang	None	Aditya Kumar Bakura	Indian National Congress
Kharagpur	None	Narayan Choubey	Communist Party of India
Kharagpur Local	None	Mrityunjoy Jana	Indian National Congress
Midnapore	None	Syed Shamsul Bari	Indian National Congress
Debra	None	Santosh Kumar Mukherjee	Indian National Congress
Keshpur	None	Bankim Roy	Indian National Congress
Garhbeta	ST	Tushar Tudu	Indian National Congress
Salbani	None	Niranjan Khamrai	Indian National Congress
Gopiballavpur	None	Surendra Nath Mahta	Indian National Congress
Nayagram	ST	Debnath Hansda	Indian National Congress
Jhargram	None	Mahendra Nath Mahata	Indian National Congress
Binpur	ST	Mangal Chandra Saren	Indian National Congress
Banduan	ST	Kandru Majhi	Lok Sewak Sangh
Manbazar	None	Girish Mahato	Lok Sewak Sangh
Balarampur	None	Padak Mahata	Lok Sewak Sangh
Arsa	None	Daman Kuiry	All India Forward Bloc
Jhalda	None	Debendra Nath Mahato	Indian National Congress
Jaipur	None	Adwaita Mandal	Lok Sewak Sangh
Purulia	None	Tara Pada Roy	Indian National Congress
Para	SC	Nepal Bauri	Indian National Congress
Raghunathpura	None	Shankar Narayan Singhadeo	Indian National Congress
Kashipura	ST	Budhan Majhi	Indian National Congress
Hura	None	Ajit Prasad Singhadeo	Indian National Congress
Indpur	SC	Ashutosh Mallick	Indian National Congress
Ranibandh	ST	Jaleswar Hansda	Communist Party of India
Raipur	None	Sudha Rani Dutta	Indian National Congress
Talangra	None	Purabi Mukhopadhyay	Indian National Congress
Onda	None	Gakul Behari Das	Indian National Congress
Vishnupur	SC	Radhika Dhibar	Communist Party of India
Kotulpur	None	Jagannath Kolay	Indian National Congress
Patrasayer	SC	Guru Pada Khan	Indian National Congress
Barjora	None	Pramatha Ghosh	Communist Party of India
Gangajalghati	SC	Sishuram Mondal	Indian National Congress
Bankura	None	Aboni Bhattacharyya	Communist Party of India
Chhatna	ST	Kamla Kanta Hemram	Indian National Congress
Saltora	None	Bidhan Chandra Roy	Indian National Congress
Hirapur	None	Gopikaranjan Mitra	Indian National Congress
Asansol	None	Bijoy Pal	Communist Party of India
Kulti	None	Jaynarayan Sharma	Indian National Congress
Barabani	None	Haridas Chakravarty	Communist Party of India
Jamuria	SC	Amarendra Mondal	Indian National Congress
Raniganj	None	Lakhan Bagdi	Communist Party of India
Durgapur	None	Ananda Gopal Mukhopadhyay	Indian National Congress
Ausgram	None	Monoranjan Baksi	Independent
Bhatar	None	Aswini Roy	Communist Party of India
Galsi	SC	Kanai Lal Das	Indian National Congress
Khandaghosh	None	Jahar Lal Banerjee	Indian National Congress
Burdwan	None	Radharani Mahatab	Indian National Congress
Raina	None	Probodh Kumar Guha	Indian National Congress
Jamalpur	SC	Mrityunjoy Pramanik	Indian National Congress
Memari	ST	Suchand Soren	Communist Party of India
Kalna	None	Hare Krishna Konar	Communist Party of India
Manteswar	None	Syed Abul Mansur Habibullah	Communist Party of India
Purbasthali	None	Bimalananda Tarkatirtha	Indian National Congress
Katwa	None	Subodh Choudhury	Communist Party of India
Mangalkot	SC	Narayandas Das	Communist Party of India
Ketugram	None	Shreemohan Thakur	Communist Party of India
Labhpur	None	Radhanath Chattoraj	Communist Party of India
Bolpur	None	Radha Krishna Singha	Revolutionary Socialist Party
Dubrajpur	None	Bhakti Bhushan Mandal	All India Forward Bloc
Rajnagar	None	Siddheswar Mandal	All India Forward Bloc
Suri	None	Baidyanath Banerjee	Indian National Congress
Mahammad Bazar	ST	Bhusan Hansdah	Indian National Congress
Mayureswar	SC	Gobardhan Das	Communist Party of India
Rampurhat	None	Niharika Majumdar	Indian National Congress
Nalhati	SC	Shiromani Prasad	Indian National Congress
Murarai	None	Ahammad Shamsuddin	Revolutionary Socialist Party
