= Partition of Bengal (1947) =

Partition of Bengal into East Bengal and West Bengal in 1947

Partition of Bengal, 1947
- Part of Partition of India
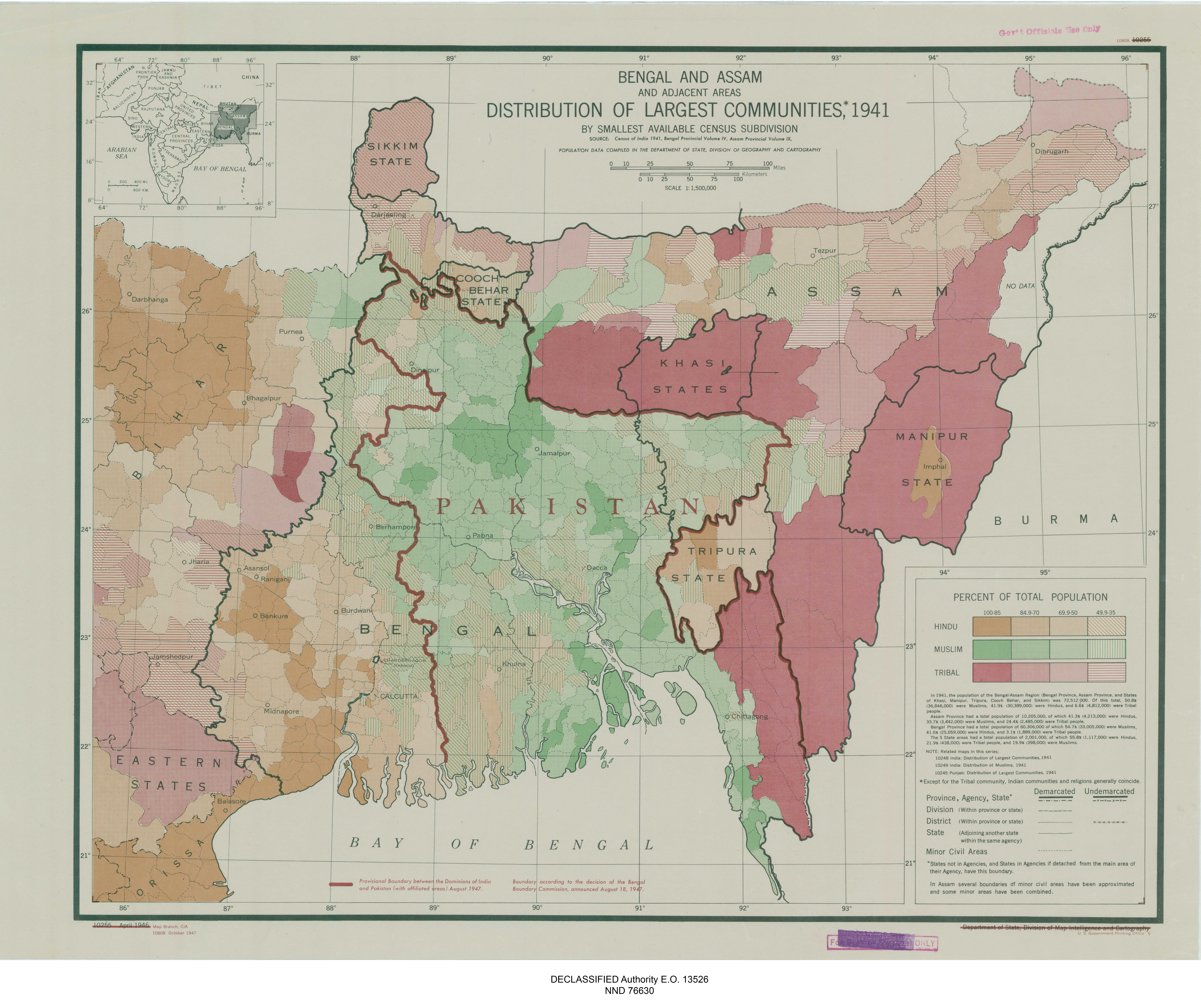
- Religious distribution of Bengal - 1941 Census of India, the basis for the partition (by CIA:1981)
- Location: Bengal Presidency, British India
- Cause: Indian Independence Act 1947
- Outcome: Bengal Presidency divided into East and West Bengal • Hindu-majority West Bengal becomes a state of India • Muslim-majority East Bengal becomes a province of Pakistan

The Partition of Bengal in 1947, also known as the Second Partition of Bengal, part of the Partition of India, divided the British Indian Bengal Province along the Radcliffe Line between the Dominion of India and the Dominion of Pakistan. The Bengali Hindu-majority West Bengal became a state of India, and the Bengali Muslim-majority East Bengal (now Bangladesh) became a province of Pakistan.

On 20 June 1947, the Bengal Legislative Assembly met to decide the future of the Bengal Province, as between being a United Bengal within India or Pakistan or divided into West Bengal and East Bengal as the homelands for the Bengali Hindus and the Bengali Muslims, respectively. At the preliminary joint session, the assembly decided by 126–90 that if it remained united, it should join the new Constituent Assembly of Pakistan. Later, a separate meeting of legislators from West Bengal decided by 58–21 that the province should be partitioned and that West Bengal should join the existing Constituent Assembly of India. In another separate meeting of legislators from East Bengal, it was decided by 106–35 that the province should not be partitioned and by 107–34 that East Bengal should join Pakistan in the event of Partition.

On 6 July 1947, the Sylhet referendum decided to sever Sylhet from Assam and merge it into East Bengal in order to join Pakistan.

The partition, with power transferred to Pakistan and India on 14–15 August 1947, was done according to what has come to be known as the 3 June Plan, or the Mountbatten Plan. Indian independence, on 15 August 1947, ended over 150 years of British rule and influence in the Indian subcontinent. East Pakistan became the independent country of Bangladesh after the 1971 Bangladesh Liberation War.

== Background ==
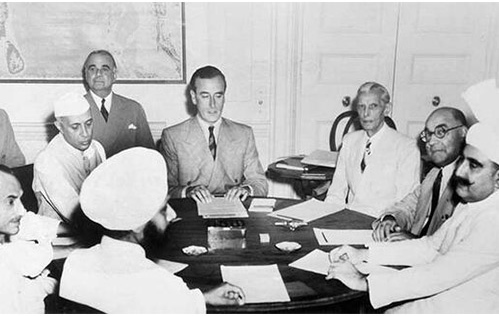
Louis Mountbatten discusses the partition plan with Jawaharlal Nehru and Mohammad Ali Jinnah

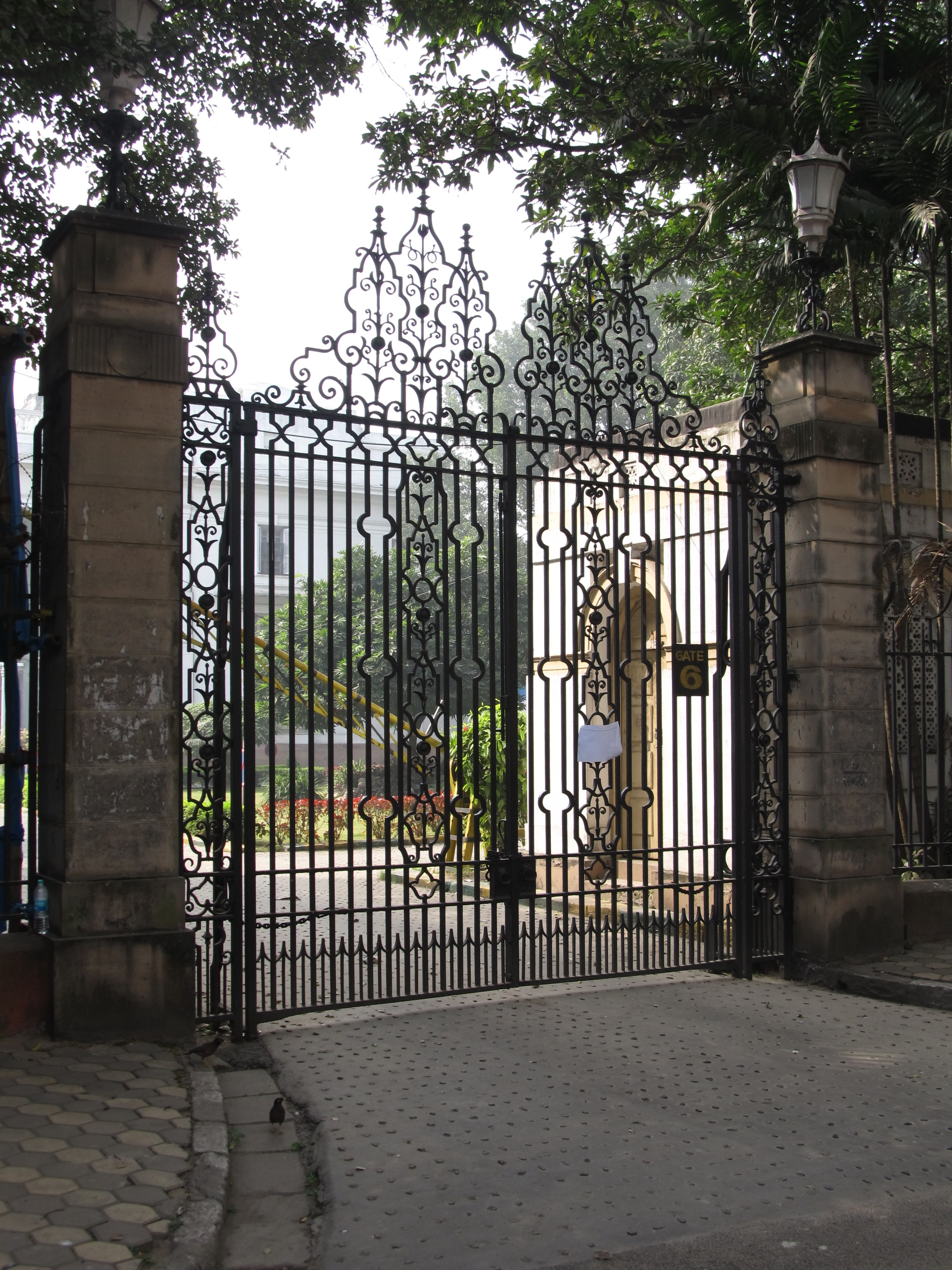
Entrance to the Legislative Assembly in Kolkata (Calcutta)

Since 1866, there had been discussions about splitting up the Bengal Presidency, which had grown too large to be administered effectively from Calcutta. This was the official reason given in 1905 for the first partition of Bengal. However, the geography of that partition had another, political, purpose, to weaken Bengali resistance to British rule. The partition divided the province between West Bengal, whose majority was Hindu, and East Bengal, whose majority was Muslim, but left considerable minorities of Hindus in East Bengal and Muslims in West Bengal. While the Muslims were in favour of the partition, as they would have their own province, Hindus opposed it. The controversy led to increased violence and protest, and in 1911, the provinces were again united.

However, the disagreements between Hindus and Muslims in Bengal that had sparked the Partition of Bengal in 1905 remained, and laws, including the Second Partition of Bengal in 1947, were implemented to fulfil the political needs of the parties involved.

== Assembly resolution about partition ==
According to plan, on 20 June 1947, the members of the Bengal Legislative Assembly cast three separate votes on the proposal to partition Bengal:

- In the joint session of the house, composed of all the members of the Assembly, the division of the joint session of the House stood at 126 votes against and 90 votes for partitioning of Bengal and joining the existing Constituent Assembly (India).
- The members of the Muslim-majority areas of Bengal in a separate session then passed a motion by 106–35 against partitioning Bengal and instead joining a new Constituent Assembly (Pakistan) as a whole.
- A separate meeting of the members of the non-Muslim-majority areas of Bengal then decided 58–21 to partition the province.

Under the Mountbatten Plan, a single majority vote in favour of partition by either of the notionally divided halves of the Assembly would have decided the division of the province, and hence the proceedings on 20 June resulted in the decision to partition Bengal. That set the stage for the creation of West Bengal as a province of India and East Bengal as a province of the Dominion of Pakistan.

Also in accordance with the Mountbatten Plan, a referendum held on 6 July saw the electorate of Sylhet vote to join East Bengal. Further, the Boundary Commission, headed by Sir Cyril Radcliffe, decided on the territorial demarcation between the two newly created provinces. Power was transferred to Pakistan and India on 14 and 15 August, respectively, under the Indian Independence Act 1947.

== Opposition to the partition ==
In Bengal, the Krishak Praja Party's Syed Habib-ul-Rahman said that partitioning India was "absurd" and "chimerical".

Rezaul Karim, a Bengali Muslim leader in the Indian National Congress, was a champion of Hindu-Muslim unity and a united India. He "argued that the idea that Hindus and Muslims are two distinct nations was ahistorical" and held that outside of the subcontinent, Indian Muslims faced discrimination. With respect to Indian civilization, Rezaul Karim declared that "Its Vedas, its Upanishads, its Rama, Sita, its Ramayana, and Mahabharat, its Krishna and Gita, its Asoka and Akbar, its Kalidas and Amir Khusru, its Aurangzeb and Dara, its Rana Pratap and Sitaram—all are our own inheritance." In 1941, Rezaul Karim published a book Pakisthan Examined with the Partition Schemes that firmly rejected the two-nation theory and opposed the division of India. Karim advocated for composite nationalism, with historian Neilesh Bose of the University of Victoria stating that "Rezaul Karim developed a Bengali Muslim composite nationalism that aimed to connect religion, region and nation in the context of a subjunctive, possible future India."

=== United Bengal plan ===
H. S. Suhrawardy, the last Prime Minister of Bengal, urged a separate independent status for the whole province

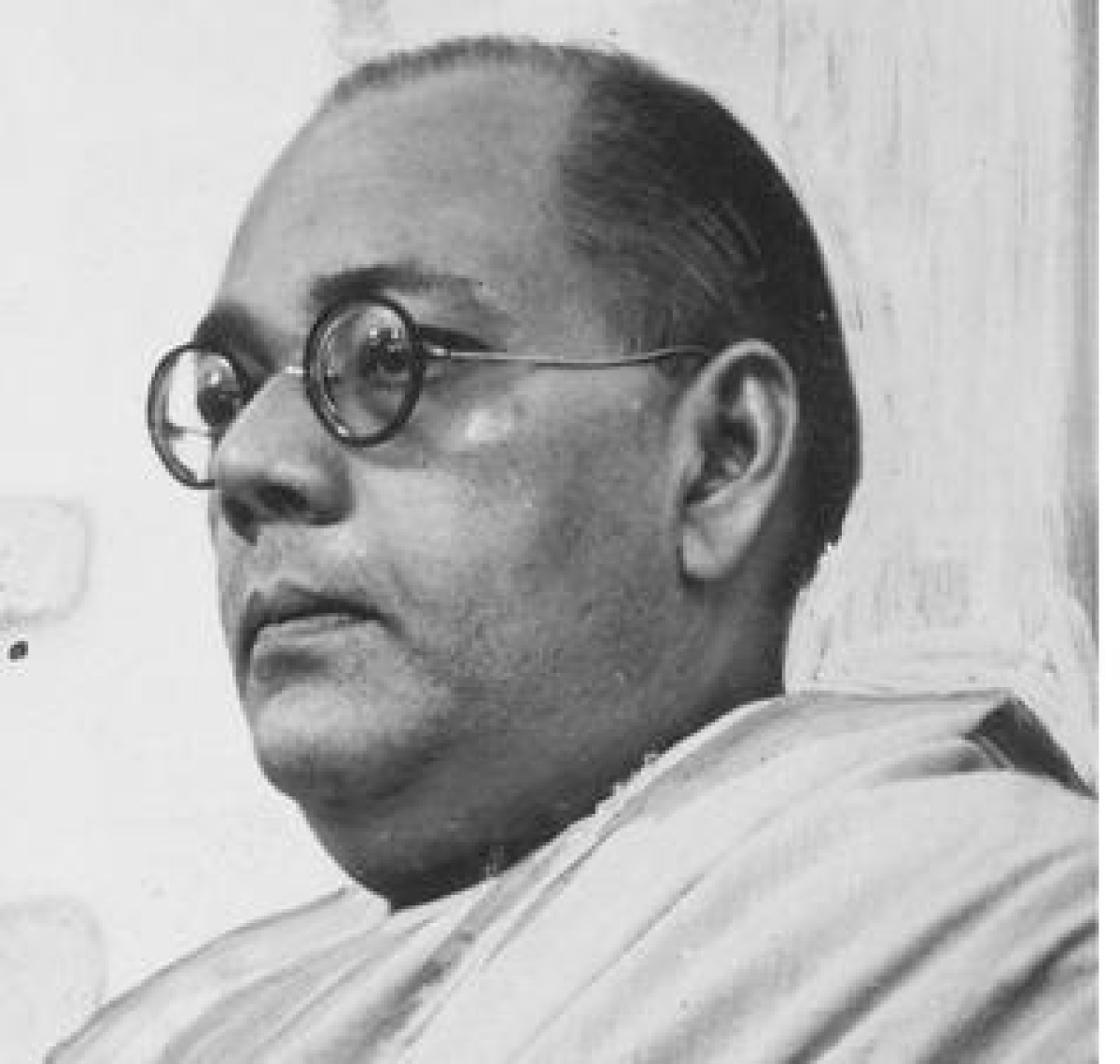
Sarat Chandra Bose supported the United Bengal plan

After it became apparent that the division of India on the basis of the two-nation theory would almost certainly result in the partition of Bengal along religious lines, the Bengal provincial Muslim League leader Huseyn Shaheed Suhrawardy came up with a new plan to create an independent Bengal state, which would join neither Pakistan nor India and remain unpartitioned. Suhrawardy realised that if Bengal was partitioned, it would be economically disastrous for East Bengal, as all coal mines, all but two jute mills, and other industrial plants would certainly go to the western part since they were in overwhelmingly Hindu areas. Most importantly, Calcutta, the largest city in India and an industrial and commercial hub and the largest port, would also go to the western part. Suhrawardy floated his idea on 27 April 1947 at a press conference in Delhi.

Muhammad Ali Jinnah, leader of the Muslim League, wanted an undivided Bengal outside the Dominion of India. He had told Mountbatten only the day before, "What is the use of Bengal without Calcutta; they had better remain united and independent; I am sure that they would be on friendly terms with us". Opinion among the Bengal provincial Muslim League leadership was divided on the question of a United Bengal. The leader Abul Hashim supported it, but Khawaja Nazimuddin, Nurul Amin and Mohammad Akram Khan opposed it. Suhrawardy lobbied Jinnah on 15 May for his support. Shortly thereafter, opponents of the proposal also met with Jinnah. In letters, he privately entertained the idea, but did not publicly endorse either side. Notwithstanding his earlier comment to Mountbatten, historians are divided as to whether he supported a United Bengal outside of Pakistan, and, if so, to what degree. Bidyut Chakrabarty and Sirajul Islam wrote that Jinnah consented to or defended the scheme, perhaps believing that an independent Bengal could be a first step towards an undivided Bengal within a greater Pakistan. Others say he either didn't support or opposed the plan.

For the Congress, only a handful of leaders agreed to the plan, such as the influential Bengal provincial Congress leader Sarat Chandra Bose, the elder brother of Netaji and Kiran Shankar Roy. However, most other leaders and Congress leaders, including Jawaharlal Nehru and Vallabhbhai Patel, rejected the plan. The nationalist Hindu Mahasabha, under the leadership of Shyama Prasad Mukherjee, vehemently opposed it and considered it nothing but a ploy by Suhrawardy to stop the partition of the state so that its industrial west, including the city of Kolkata, would remain under League control. It also claimed that even if the plan was for a sovereign Bengal state, it would be a virtual Pakistan, and the Hindu minority would always be at the mercy of the Muslim majority.

Although the chance of the proposal seeing light without the Congress central committee's approval was slim, Bose and Suhrawardy continued talks to reach an agreement on the political structure of the proposed state. Like Suhrawardy, Bose also felt that partition would severely hamper Bengal's economy, and almost half of the Hindus would be left stranded in East Bengal. The agreement was published on 24 May 1947, but was largely political. The proposal had little support at the grassroots level, particularly among Hindus. The Muslim League's continuous propaganda for the two-nation theory during the past six years, as well as the marginalisation of Hindus in the Suhrawardy ministry and the vicious 1946 riots, which many Hindus believed to have been sponsored by the state, left little room for trust by the Bengali Hindus. Soon, Bose and Suhrawardy were divided on the nature of the electorate: separate or joint. Suhrawardy insisted upon maintaining the separate electorates for Muslims and non-Muslims. Bose opposed the idea and withdrew. The lack of any other significant support by the Congress caused the United Bengal plan to be discarded. Still, the relatively unknown episode marked the last attempt among Bengali Muslim and Hindu leadership to avoid Partition and to live together.

== Displacement ==
=== 1946–1951 ===
Following the partition of Bengal between the Hindu-majority West Bengal and the Muslim-majority East Bengal, there was an influx of Bengali Hindu/Bengali Muslim refugees from both sides. An estimation suggests that before the Partition, West Bengal had a population of 21.2 million, of whom 5.3 million, or roughly 25 percent, were Muslim minorities. Most of the Muslim population were native Bengali Muslims, whereas East Bengal had 39.1 million people, of whom 10.94 million or roughly 28 percent were Hindu minorities, i.e. predominantly native Bengali Hindus. Nearly 2.04 million Bengali Hindus left Pakistan's East Bengal for India's West Bengal region, and 1.72 million Bengali Muslims left India's West Bengal for Pakistan's East Bengal region immediately after the Partition because of violence and rioting resulting from mobs supporting West Bengal and East Bengal. However, most Muslims who left in 1947 returned soon after to India's West Bengal before the Liaquat–Nehru Pact, which was signed in 1950.

Unlike Punjab, where a full population exchange between Punjabi Muslims and Punjabi Sikhs/Punjabi Hindus during the partition happened, the same complete population exchange did not happen in Bengal (the population transfer between Bengali Hindus and Bengali Muslims was lower due to the occurrence of less violence); overall it was one-sided, i.e. most of the Bengali Hindus, mainly from upper caste left East Bengal, but most of the Bengali Muslims didn't leave West Bengal. During Partition, Hindu Mahasabha leader Shyama Prasad Mukherjee demanded a full exchange of population—an exchange of the Bengali Muslim population of West Bengal with that of Bengali Hindus of East Bengal—but it didn't happen due to the lack of interest of Central Government leaders of that time. Presently, only 8 percent of Bangladesh (then East Bengal) is Hindu, whereas West Bengal is still 27 percent Muslim, compared to 25 percent at the time of Partition.

=== 1960 ===
An estimated one million Hindu refugees had entered West Bengal by 1960, and close to 700,000 Muslims left for East Pakistan. The refugee influx in Bengal was also accompanied by the fact that the government was less prepared to rehabilitate them, which resulted in huge housing and sanitation problems for the millions, most of whom were owners of large property back in East Bengal.

=== 1964 ===
During the East Pakistan riot of 1964, it is estimated, according to Indian authorities, 135,000 Hindu refugees arrived in West Bengal from East Pakistan, and the Muslims started to migrate to East Pakistan from West Bengal. According to Pakistani figures, by early April, 83,000 Muslim refugees had arrived from West Bengal.

=== 1971 ===
In 1971, during the Bangladesh Liberation War against Pakistan, a large group of refugees numbering an estimated 7,235,916 arrived from Bangladesh to India's West Bengal. Nearly 95% of them were Bengali Hindus, and, after the independence of Bangladesh, nearly 1,521,912 Bengali Hindu refugees decided to stay in West Bengal. The Bangladeshi Hindus were mainly settled in the Nadia, North 24 Parganas, and South 24 Parganas districts of West Bengal after 1971.

== Aftermath ==
Before the official Radcliffe Line was drawn in 1947, these were the religious demographics in Bengal:

- Muslim-majority districts: Dinajpur, Rangpur, Malda, Murshidabad, Rajshahi, Bogra, Pabna, Mymensingh, Jessore, Nadia, Faridpur, Dhaka, Tippera, Bakerganj, Noakhali and Chittagong.
- Hindu-majority districts: Calcutta, Howrah, Hooghly, Birbhum, Burdwan, Bankura, Midnapore, Jalpaiguri, Darjeeling, 24 Pargan and Khulna
- Buddhist-majority district: Chittagong Hill Tract
- Assam Province: Sylhet (muslim majority)

Final division:

- Pakistan: East Dinajpur, Rangpur, Rajshahi, Bogra, Pabna, Mymensingh, Sylhet (except Karimganj), Khulna, Bakerganj, Tippera (plain Tripura), Noakhali, Chittagong, Jessore, East Nadia, Chittagong Hill Tracts, parts of Malda district.
- India: West Dinajpur, Jalpaiguri, Darjeeling, Malda, Murshidabad, West Nadia, Calcutta, 24 Pargana, Burdwan, Birbhum, Midnapore, Howrah, Hooghly,parts of Bongaon sub-division from Jessore, Karimganj district in Assam.

The second partition of Bengal left behind a legacy of violence that has continued ever since. As Bashabi Fraser put it, "There is the reality of the continuous flow of 'economic migrants'/'refugees'/'infiltrators'/'illegal immigrants' who cross over the border and pan out across the subcontinent, looking for work and a new home, settling in metropolitan centres as far off as Delhi and Mumbai, keeping the question of Partition alive today".

=== Displacement crisis ===
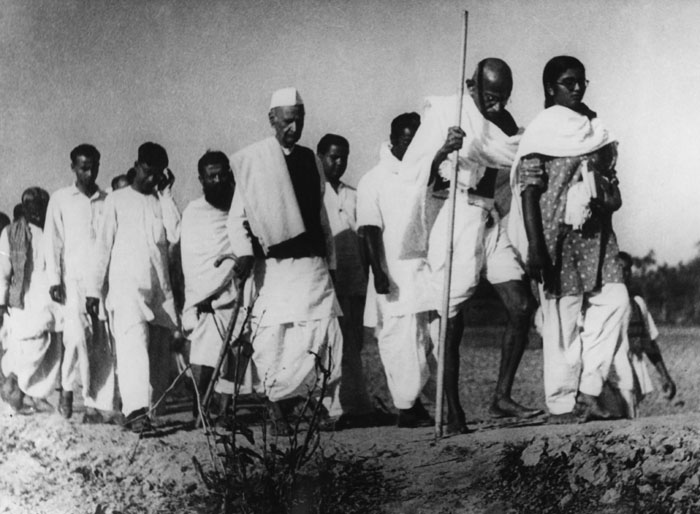
Gandhi in Noakhali, 1946

A massive population transfer began immediately after partition. Millions of Hindus migrated to India from East Bengal, and most of them settled in West Bengal. A significant number even went to Assam, Tripura and other states. However, the refugee crisis was markedly different from Punjab at India's western border. Punjab had witnessed widespread communal riots immediately before partition. As a result, the population transfer in Punjab happened almost immediately after Partition, as terrified people left their homes from both sides. Within a year, the population exchange had been largely complete between East and West Punjab, but in Bengal, violence was limited to Kolkata and Noakhali. Hence, in Bengal, the migration occurred much more gradually and continued over the three decades after partition. Although riots were limited in pre-independence Bengal, the environment was communally charged. Both Hindus in East Bengal and Muslims in West Bengal felt unsafe and had to take a crucial decision on whether to leave for an uncertain future in another country or to stay in subjugation under the other community. Among Hindus in East Bengal, those who were better placed economically left first. Government employees were given a chance to swap their posts between India and Pakistan. The educated urban upper and middle classes, the rural gentry, traders, businessmen and artisans left for India soon after partition. They often had relatives and other connections in West Bengal and settled with less difficulty. Muslims followed a similar pattern. The urban and educated upper and middle classes left for East Bengal first.

However, poorer Hindus in East Bengal, most of whom are Dalits found it much more difficult to migrate. Their only property was immovable land holdings. Many sharecroppers had no skills other than farming. As a result, most of them decided to stay in East Bengal. However, the political climate in Pakistan deteriorated soon after partition, and communal violence started to rise. In 1950, severe riots occurred in Barisal and other places in East Pakistan, causing a further exodus of Hindus. The situation was vividly described by Jogendra Nath Mandal's resignation letter to Pakistani Prime Minister Liaquat Ali Khan. Mandal was a dalit leader and despite being of a depressed class, he supported the Muslim League as a protest to the subjugation of lower-castes by their higher-caste coreligionists. He fled to India and resigned from his cabinet minister's post. For the next two decades, Hindus left East Bengal whenever communal tensions flared up or the relationship between India and Pakistan deteriorated, as in 1964. The situation of the Hindu minority in East Bengal reached its worst in the months preceding and during the Bangladesh Liberation War of 1971, when the Pakistani Army systematically targeted ethnic Bengalis, regardless of religious background, as part of Operation Searchlight.

In independent Bangladesh, state-sponsored discrimination of Hindus largely stopped. However, like India, the two communities' relationship remains tense and occasional communal violence occurred, such as in the aftermath of Babri Mosque demolition.

Though Muslims in post-independence West Bengal faced some discrimination, it was unlike the state-sponsored discrimination faced by the Hindus in East Bengal. Most Hindus fled from East Bengal, but Muslims largely stayed on in West Bengal. Over the years, however, the community became ghettoised and was socially and economically segregated from the majority community. West Bengali Muslims are highly marginalised, as can be seen from social indicators like literacy and per capita income.

Apart from West Bengal, thousands of Bihari Muslims also settled in East Bengal. They had suffered terribly in severe riots before partition. However, they supported West Pakistan during the Liberation War and were subsequently denied citizenship in independent Bangladesh. Most of the Bihari refugees have remained stateless.

==== Statistics ====
The 1951 census in India recorded 2.523 million refugees from East Bengal, 2.061 million of whom settled in West Bengal. The rest went to Assam, Tripura and other states. By 1973, their number reached over 6 million. The following table shows the major waves of refugee influx and the incident that caused it. (Note: During the Bangladesh Liberation War, 11 million people from both communities took shelter in India. After the war 1.5 million decided to stay.)

Year	Reason	Number in lakhs
1947	Partition	3.44
1948	Hyderabad annexation by India	7.86
1956	Pakistan becomes an Islamic Republic	3.20
1964	Riots over Hazratbal incident	6.93
1971	Bangladesh Liberation War	15

The 1951 census in Pakistan recorded 671,000 refugees in East Bengal, the majority of whom came from West Bengal. The rest were from Bihar. By 1961, the numbers reached 850,000. Crude estimates suggest that about 1.5 million Muslims migrated from West Bengal and Bihar to East Bengal in the two decades after partition.

==== Government response ====
In Punjab, the Indian government anticipated a population transfer and was ready to take proactive measures. Land plots that were evacuated by Muslims were allotted to incoming Hindu and Sikh refugees. The government allocated substantial resources for the rehabilitation of refugees in Punjab. In contrast, there was no such planning in the eastern part of the country. Neither the central nor the West Bengal state governments anticipated any large-scale population exchange, and no co-ordinated policy was in place to rehabilitate millions of homeless people. The newly independent country had few resources, and the central government was exhausted in resettling 7 million refugees in Punjab. Instead of providing rehabilitation, the Indian government tried to stop and even to reverse the refugee influx from East Bengal. India and Pakistan signed the Liaquat–Nehru Pact in 1950 to stop any further population exchange between West and East Bengal. Even after it became clear that refugees were determined not to be sent back, the central government failed to provide any significant assistance. The government policy of East Bengal refugee rehabilitation mostly consisted of sending them to empty areas, mostly outside of West Bengal. One of the most controversial schemes was the government's decision to settle the refugees by force in Dandakaranya, a barren plot of land in Central India.

==== Social impact ====
Without the government's assistance, the refugees often settled themselves. Some found jobs in factories. Many took small businesses and hawking. Numerous refugee colonies sprang up in Nadia, 24 Paraganas and Kolkata's suburbs. It has been argued recently that the refugees facilitated an incremental urbanization without accumulation, in the frontiers of Calcutta. The process has been termed as 'urbanization with de-accumulation'.

==== Tripura's tribal insurgency ====
The princely state of Tripura had a predominantly-tribal population, but educated Bengalis were welcomed by the King and were prominent in the state's administration in pre-independence India. However, after partition, thousands of Bengali Hindus migrated to Tripura, which changed the state's demography significantly. Tripura's tribes became a minority in their own homeland and lost their land holdings. As a result, a tribal insurgency began, causing violent riots among tribes and Bengalis in 1980. A low-scale insurgency has continued ever since.

Many Bengalis migrated from East Bengal region during Partition and the Liberation War, but half of the Bengali community of Tripura has lived in Tripura for hundreds of years, according to the 1901 census report, which clearly stated that Bengali and Tripura had numbers that were almost equal.

=== Economic impact ===
==== West Bengal ====
Radcliffe's line split Bengal, which had always historically been a single economic, cultural and ethnic (Bengali-Hindu or Bengali-Muslim) zone, into two halves. Both halves were intricately connected. The fertile East produced food and raw materials, which the West consumed, and the industrialised West produced manufactured goods, which were consumed by the East. According to the POV, this was either considered an exploitative or a mutually beneficial trade and exchange. This was, naturally, severely disrupted by Partition. Rail, road and water communication routes were severed between them.

After Partition, West Bengal suffered from a substantial food shortage as the fertile rice-producing districts went to East Bengal. The shortage continued into the 1950s and the 1960s. By 1959, West Bengal faced an annual food shortage of 950,000 tones. Hunger marches became a common sight in Kolkata.

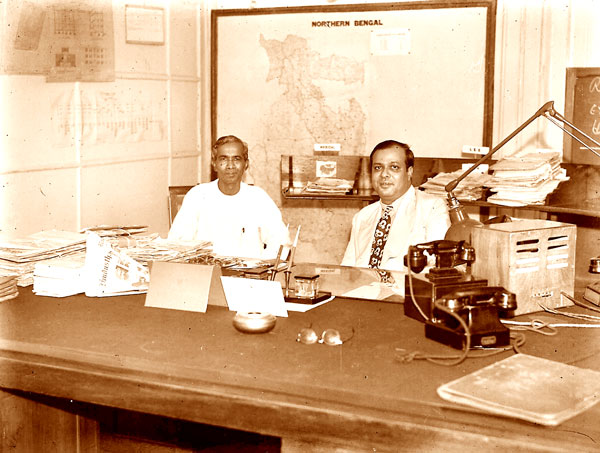
Prafulla Chandra Ghosh (left), the first chief minister of West Bengal, with Mohammad Ali of Bogra

Jute was the largest industry in Bengal at Partition. The Radcliffe Line left every single jute mill in West Bengal but four fifths of the jute-producing land in East Bengal. The best-quality fibre yielding breeds of jute were cultivated mostly in East Bengal. India and Pakistan initially agreed to a trade agreement to import raw jute from East Bengal for West Bengal's mills. However, Pakistan had plans to set up its own mills and put restrictions on raw jute export to India. West Bengal's mills faced an acute shortage, and the industry faced a crisis. On the other hand, jute farmers in East Bengal were now without a market to sell their produce. Exporting jute to West Bengal suddenly became an anti-national act for Pakistan. Smuggling of raw jute shot up across the border, but West Bengal rapidly increased jute production and in the mid-to-late 1950s became largely self-sufficient in jute. West Bengal's mills became less dependent on East Bengal for raw materials. Pakistan also set up new factories to process its local produce instead of exporting to India. The following table shows jute production details in both countries in 1961:

Year 1961	Area Harvested (Ha)	Yield (Hg/Ha)	Production (tonnes)
East Pakistan	834000	15761	1314540
India	917000	12479	1144400

West Bengal's paper and leather industry faced similar problems. The paper mills used East Bengal's bamboo, and the tanneries consumed leather, which was also mainly produced in East Bengal. Like jute, the lack of raw materials pushed both industries into decline.

The pressure of millions of refugees, food shortages and industrial decline after independence put West Bengal in a severe crisis. Dr. B. C. Roy's government tried to cope with the situation by initiating several projects. The government built irrigation schemes such as the Mayurakshi project and undertook construction of the Durgapur Steel Plant, but they failed to arrest West Bengal's decline. Poverty rose, and West Bengal lost its top place and lagged well behind other Indian states in industrial development. Massive political unrest, strikes and violence crippled the state for the three decades after Partition.

==== North East India ====
Rail and road links connecting North East India to the rest of the country passed through East Bengal territory. The lines connecting Siliguri in North Bengal to Kolkata and Assam to Chittagong were severed. The whole Assam Railway was cut off from the rest of the Indian system. Those lines carried almost all freight traffic from those regions. The most important commodities were tea and timber. The tea industry in Assam depended on the Chittagong Port to export its produce and import raw materials for the industry, such as coal, which was used as the fuel to dry the tea leaves. The industry was severely hit, as Chittagong went to Pakistan. Initially, India and Pakistan reached an agreement to allow cross-border transit traffic, but India now had to pay a tariff. By 1950, India had reconnected Assam to the rest of the country's rail network by building a 229 km meter gauge rail link through the Siliguri Corridor, but now the Tea chests from Assam's gardens would have to be carried over a much longer distance to reach the Port of Kolkata. Exporting tea via the nearby Chittagong port was still an option, but after the Indo-Pakistani War of 1965, all transit traffic was switched off by Pakistan.

East Pakistan became independent Bangladesh in 1971, but cross-border railway traffic did not resume until 2003. By the 1990s, India upgraded the Assam rail link to 5 ft 6 in (1,676 mm) broad gauge up to Dibrugarh, thereby easing the traffic problem in the Brahmaputra Valley region, but the southern section of the area, which comprises Tripura, Mizoram, Manipur and Barak valley of Assam, still faces serious connectivity problems. Talks between both countries are underway to allow transit traffic between the area and Mainland India through Bangladesh. In 2023, a new cross-border rail line through Bangladesh connecting Tripura to Kolkata was established, with the aim of reducing travel time to 12 hours.

==== East Bengal ====
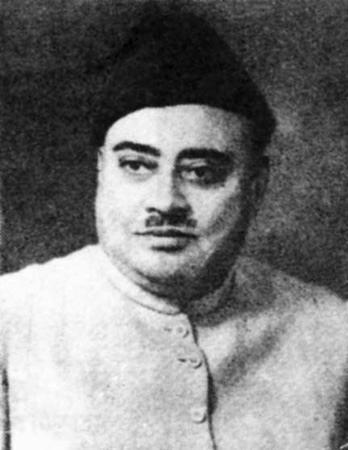
Sir Khawaja Nazimuddin, the first chief minister of East Bengal

At Partition, East Bengal had no large industry. There were few mineral resources in this region. Its economy was completely agrarian. The main produce was food grains and other crops, jute, bamboo, leather and fish. The raw materials were consumed by factories in and around Kolkata. Kolkata was the centre of Bengal's economic and social development for both Hindus and Muslims. All large industries, military bases and government offices, and most of the institutions of higher education were in Kolkata. Without Kolkata, East Bengal was decapitated. It lost its traditional market for agricultural products. It also lost Kolkata, the most important port of the country. East Bengal had to begin from nothing. Dhaka was then only a district headquarters. Government offices had to be placed inside makeshift buildings. Dhaka also faced a severe human resource crisis. The majority of high-ranking officers in British Indian administration were Hindu and migrated to West Bengal. Often, the posts had to be filled up by West Pakistani officers. Desperately poor, East Bengal soon became politically dominated by West Pakistan. Economic disparities and subjugation of Bengalis by the Punjabi elite eventually led to a struggle for separation in 1971.

== In popular culture ==
Chinnamul (The Uprooted), a 1950 Bengali film directed by Nemai Ghosh, first dealt with the theme of the partition of Bengal. This was followed by Ritwik Ghatak's trilogy, Meghe Dhaka Tara (Cloud-covered Stars) (1960), Komal Gandhar (1961), and Subarnarekha (1962), all dealing with the aftermath of the partition. Deepa Mehta's (2012) film adaptation of Salman Rushdie's (1981) novel Midnight's Children captures the uncertainty of partition in both the Punjab and Bengal context, subsequent violence, the transition of independent India and Pakistan stripped of British rule, and the liberation of Bangladesh in 1971 from West Pakistan. The film Rajkahini (2015), directed by Srijit Mukherji is based on the theme of the partition of Bengal in 1947. Tanvir Mokammel's (2017) documentary Seemantorekha (The Borderline) "documents the journey of four individuals to their erstwhile homes in Bangladesh and West Bengal".

There are other contemporary films as well that capture the aftermath of partition, however, mostly set in the context of Punjab and other parts of the subcontinent. Notably, Chandraprakash Dwivedi's (2003) period drama titled Pinjar, based on the Punjabi novel of the same name by Amrita Pritam, portrays the horrors of partition, communal violence, and the predicament of women during the years preceding and succeeding 1947. The film Manto (2018), directed by Nandita Das on the life of the Urdu writer Saadat Hasan Manto portrayed the impact of partition, mass displacement, and communal violence in the northern and western parts of the Indian subcontinent. The web series Jubliee (2023), created by Vikramaditya Motwane and Soumik Sen, featuring Prosenjit Chatterjee, Aparshakti Kurana, and Aditi Rao Hydari depicted the partition of India and its impact on cities like Lucknow and Bombay with communal riots and mass frenzy.

== Districts of Bengal Presidency 1937–1947 ==
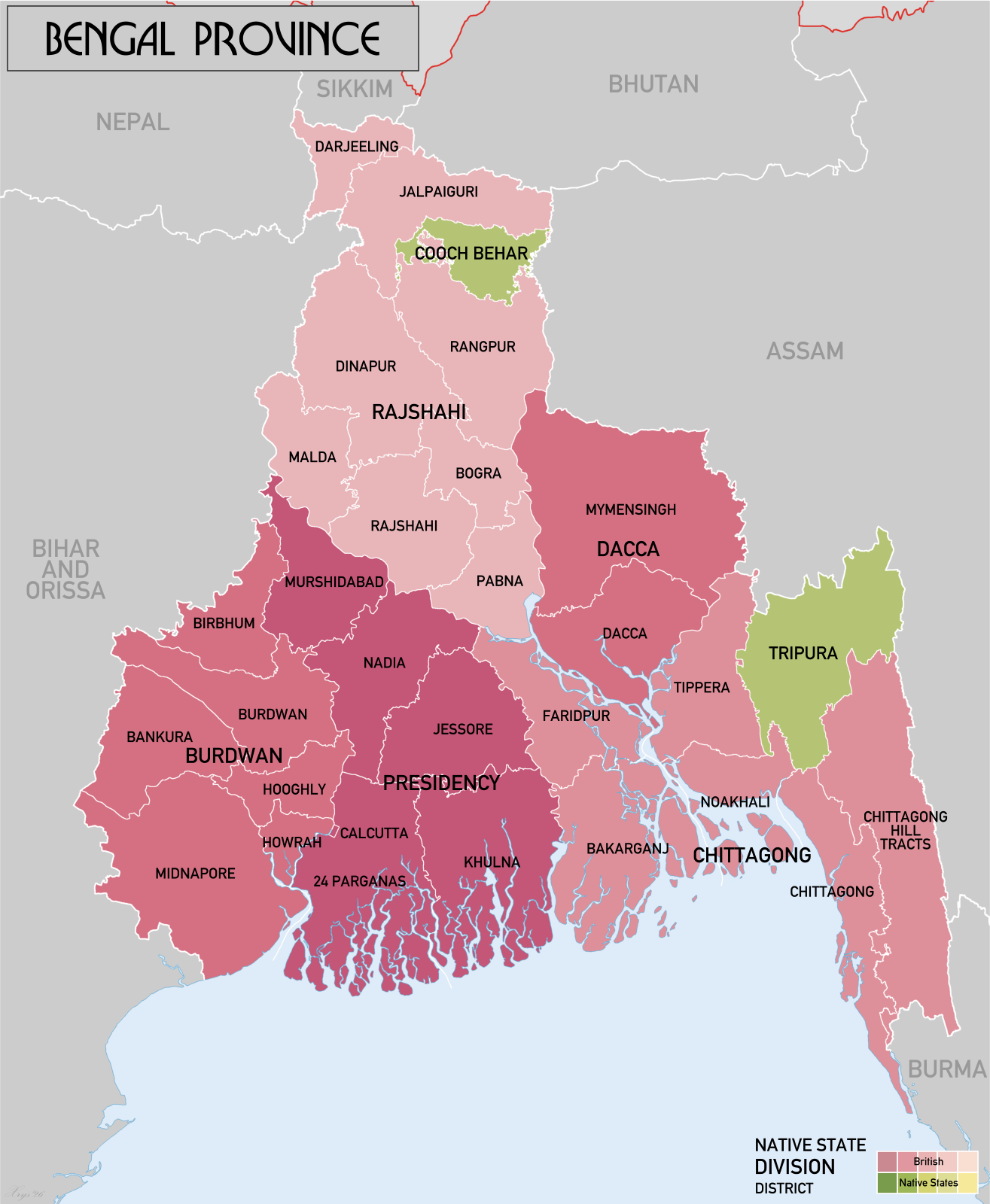
Bengal Province after the bifurcation of Bihar and Orissa and separation of Assam

The Bengal Presidency was administratively divided into a number of districts, each headed by a District Collector under the supervision of the provincial government in Calcutta. The number and boundaries of districts changed over time due to administrative reforms, territorial annexations, and the separation of Bihar, Orissa, and Assam at different periods.

The following table shows the districts in the Bengal Presidency and religious demographic based on the Census of India, 1941.

In 1947, right before the border was drawn, the undivided Province of Bengal was structured into 5 major administrative divisions, containing 28 direct British-governed districts which were further split into a total of 87 administrative subdivisions. And there were 650 thanas out of which 240 remained in India and 410 were given to Pakistan (Now Bangladesh)

5 Major administrative divisions of Bengal Province in 1947 are :

1. Burdwan Division
2. Presidency Division
3. Rajshahi Division
4. Dacca Division
5. Chittagong Division

Burdwan Division (19 Subdivisions):

Located in western Bengal, this entire division went to India Intact:

1. Burdwan (4) : Burdwan Sadar, Asansol, Kalna, Katwa.
2. Midnapore (5) : Midnapore Sadar, Jhargram, Ghatal, Contai, Tamluk
3. Hooghly (3) : Chinsurah Sadar, Serampore, Arambagh
4. Bankura (2) : Bankura Sadar, Bishnupur
5. Birbhum (2) : Suri Sadar, Rampurhat
6. Howrah (2) :Howrah Sadar, Uluberia

Presidency Division (23):

Located in central and south-western, it was divided between two countries each get almost half-half:

1. Calcutta(Municipal Area) : Calcutta Municipal Area
2. 24 Parganas (5) : Alipur Sadar Barasat, Basirhat, Diamond Harbour, Barrackpore
3. Khulna (3) : Khulna sadar, Bagerhat, Satkhira
4. Jessore (5) : Jessore Sadar, Jhenaidah, Magura, Narail, Bangaon
5. Nadia (5) : Krishnanagar Sadar, Ranaghat, Kushtia, Meherpur, Chuadanga
6. Mushidabad (4) : Berhampore Sadar, Lalbagh, Kandi, Jangipur

Rajshahi Division (20):

Located in northern part, it was divided between two countries Pakistan get some extra land than that of India :

1. Rajshahi (3) : Rajshahi Sadar, Natore, Naugaon
2. Dinajpur (3) : Dinajpur Sadar, Balurghat, Thakurgaon
3. Jalpaiguri (2) : Jalpaiguri Sadar, Alipur
4. Darjeeling (4) : Darjeeling Sadar, Kalimpong, Kurseong, Siliguri
5. Rangpur (4) : Rangpur Sadar, Nilphamari, Kurigaon, Gaibandha
6. Bogra (1) : Bogra Sadar
7. Pabna (2) : Pabna Sadar, Sirajganj
8. Malda (1) : Malda

Dacca Division (17) :

Located Central - East part, entire division went to Pakistan:

1. Dacca (4) : Dacca Sadar, Narayanganj, Munshiganj, Manikganj
2. Mymensingh (5) : Mymensingh Sadar, Jamalpur, Tangail, Netrokona, Kishoreganj
3. Faridpur (4) : Faridpur Sadar, Gopalganj, Madaripur, Goalundo
4. Bakerganj (4) : Barisal Sadar, Pirojpur, Dakhinshabazpur(Bhola), Patuakhali

Chittagong Division (9) :

Located in south-east, entire division went to Pakistan :

1. Chittagong (2) : Chittagong Sadar, Cox's Bazar
2. Tippera (3) : Comilla Sadar, Brahmanberia, Chandpur
3. Noakhali (2) : Noakhali Sadar, Feni
4. Chittagong Hill Tract (2) : Rangamati Sadar, Ramgarh

District	Sub-Divisions(in 1947)	Total population	Muslim population	Muslim %	Hindu population	Hindu %	Other population	Other %	Succeeding Country	Subdivisions are given as part in India	Present part in India	Subdivisions are given as part in Bangladesh	Present part in Bangladesh
24 Parganas	1. Alipur Sadar; 2. Barasat; 3. Basirhat; 4. Diamond Harbour; 5. Barrackpore	3,536,386	1,148,180	32.47	2,126,265	60.13	261,941	7.41	India	1. Alipur Sadar; 2. Barasat; 3. Basirhat; 4. Diamond Harbour; 5. Barrackpore	★South 24 Parganas district ★North 24 Parganas district except Bangaon subdivision		
Bakarganj	1. Barisal Sadar; 2. Bhola; 3. Jhalokati; 4. Pirojpur; 5. Patuakhali	3,549,010	2,567,027	72.33	958,629	27.01	23,354	0.66	Pakistan			Barisal Sadar; Bhola; Jhalokati; Pirojpur; Patuakhali	★Barishal District ★Patuakhali District ★Bhola District ★Barguna District ★Jhalokati District ★Pirojpur District
Bankura	1. Bankura Sadar; 2. Bishnupur	1,289,640	55,564	4.31	1,078,559	83.63	155,517	12.06	India	Bankura Sadar; Bishnupur	★Bankura district		
Birbhum	1. Suri Sadar; 2. Rampurhat	1,048,317	287,310	27.41	686,436	65.48	74,571	7.11	India	Suri Sadar; Rampurhat	★Birbhum District		
Bogra	1. Bogra Sadar	1,260,463	1,057,902	83.93	187,532	14.87	15,029	1.19	Pakistan			1. Bogra Sadar	★Bogura District ★Joypurhat District
Burdwan	1. Burdwan Sadar; 2. Asansol; 3. Kalna; 4. Katwa	1,890,732	336,665	17.81	1,078,559	57.04	475,508	25.15	India	Burdwan Sadar; Asansol; Kalna; Katwa	★Paschim Burdwan district ★Purba Burdwan district		
Calcutta	1. No Sub-Division	2,108,891	497,535	23.59	1,551,532	73.56	59,824	2.84	India	No Sub-Division	★Kolkata district		
Chittagong	1. Chittagong Sadar; 2. Cox's Bazar	2,153,296	1,605,183	74.55	458,074	21.28	90,039	4.18	Pakistan			Chittagong Sadar; Cox's Bazar	★Chattogram District ★Cox's Bazar District
Chittagong Hills	1. Rangamati; 2. Khagrachhari; 3. Bandarban	247,053	7,270	2.94	4,878	1.97	234,905	95.09	Pakistan			Rangamati; Khagrachhari; Bandarban	★Rangamati District ★Bandarban District ★Khagrachhari District
Dacca	1. Dacca Sadar; 2. Manikganj; 3. Munshiganj; 4. Narayanganj	4,222,143	2,841,261	67.29	1,360,132	32.22	20,750	0.49	Pakistan			Dacca Sadar; Manikganj; Munshiganj; Narayanganj	★Dhaka District ★Gazipur District ★Narayanganj District ★Manikganj District ★Munshiganj District ★Narsingdi District
Darjeeling	1. Darjeeling Sadar; 2. Kurseong; 3. Siliguri; 4. Kalimpong	376,369	9,125	2.42	178,496	47.42	188,748	50.16	India	Darjeeling Sadar; Kurseong; Siliguri; Kalimpong	★Darjeeling district ★Kalimpong district		
Dinajpur	1. Dinajpur Sadar; 2. Thakurgaon; 3. Balurghat	1,926,833	967,246	50.20	485,716	25.21	473,871	24.59	Divided between India and Pakistan|	Dinajpur Sadar (only 6 thanas i.e. Raiganj, Kaliaganj, Itahar, Hemtabad, Kushmundi & Bansihari , rest to Pakistan); Balurghat(except 4 thanas i.e. Panitala, Dhamnirhat, Porsha, Phulbari)	★Dakshin Dinajpur district ★Raiganj subdivision of Uttar Dinajpur district	Dinajpur Sadar (except 6 thanas i.e. Raiganj, Kaliaganj, Itahar, Hemtabad, Kushmundi & Bansihari ); Thakurgaon; Balurghat(only 4 thanas i.e. Panitala, Dhamnirhat, Porsha, Phulbari)	★Dinajpur District ★Thakurgaon District ★Atwari Upazila of Panchagarh District ★Porsha, Patnitala, Dhamoihat, Sapahar Upazila of Naogaon District
Faridpur	1. Faridpur Sadar; 2. Goalundo(Rajbari); 3. Gopalganj; 4. Madaripur	2,888,803	1,871,336	64.78	866,871	30.00	150,596	5.21	Pakistan			Faridpur Sadar; Goalundo(Rajbari); Gopalganj; Madaripur	★Faridpur District ★Gopalganj District ★Rajbari District ★Shariatpur District ★Madaripur District
Hooghly	1. Chinsurah Sadar; 2. Serampore; 3. Arambagh	1,377,729	207,077	15.03	1,099,534	79.81	71,118	5.16	India	Chinsurah Sadar; Serampore; Arambagh	★Hooghly district		
Howrah	1. Howrah Sadar; 2. Uluberia	1,490,304	296,325	19.88	1,184,553	79.48	98,674	6.60	India	Howrah Sadar; Uluberia	★Howrah district		
Jalpaiguri	1. Jalpaiguri Sadar; 2. Alipurduar	1,089,513	251,460	23.08	417,562	38.33	420,491	38.59	Divided between India and Pakistan	Jalpaiguri Sadar (except Panchagarh, Boda, Debiganj, Tetulia & Patgram thanas); Alipurduar	★Jalpaiguri District ★Alipurduar District	Jalpaiguri Sadar (only Panchagarh, Boda, Debiganj, Tetulia & Patgram thanas and rest to India)	★Panchagarh District without Atwari Upazila ★Patgram Upazila of Lalmonirhat District
Jessore	1. Jessore Sadar; 2. Jhenaidah; 3. Magura; 4. Narail; 5. Bangaon	1,828,216	1,100,713	60.21	721,079	39.44	6,424	0.35	Divided between India and Pakistan	Bangaon (except Sarsa & Maheshpur)	★Bangaon subdivision of North 24 Parganas district	Jessore Sadar; Jhenaidah; Magura; Narail; Sarsa & Maheshpur from Bongaon Subdivision	★Jessore district ★Jhenaidah District ★Magura District ★Narail District
Khulna	1. Khulna Sadar; 2. Bagerhat; 3. Satkhira	1,943,218	959,172	49.36	977,693	50.31	6,353	0.33	Pakistan		Khulna Sadar; Bagerhat; Satkhira		★Khulna District ★Satkhira District ★Bagerhat District
Malda	1. Malda Sadar	1,232,618	699,945	56.79	465,678	37.78	67,000	5.44	Divided between India and Pakistan|	Malda Sadar(except bholaghat, Nawabganj,Nachole, Sibganj, Gomastapur police stations)	★Malda District	Malda Sadar ( only bholaghat, Nawabganj,Nachole, Sibganj, Gomastapur police stations and rest to India)	★Chapai Nawabganj District
Midnapur	1. Mednipur Sadar; 2. Jhargram; 3. Ghatal; 4. Tamluk; 5. Contai	3,190,647	246,559	7.73	2,682,963	84.09	261,125	8.18	India	1. Mednipur Sadar; 2. Jhargram; 3. Ghatal; 4. Tamluk; 5. Contai	★Purba Medinipur District ★Paschim Medinipur district ★Jhargram district		
Murshidabad	1. Berhampore Sadar; 2. Lalbagh; 3. Kandi; 4. Jangipur	1,640,530	927,747	56.55	657,868	40.11	54,915	3.34	India	Berhampore Sadar; Lalbagh; Kandi; Jangipur	★Murshidabad district		
Mymensingh	1. Mymensingh Sadar; 2. Jamalpur; 3. Kishoreganj; 4. Netrokona; 5. Tangail	6,023,758	4,664,548	77.44	1,296,638	21.52	62,572	1.04	Pakistan			Mymensingh Sadar; Jamalpur; Kishoreganj; Netrokona; Tangail	★Mymensingh District ★Tangail District ★Kishoreganj District ★Jamalpur District ★Netrokona District ★Sherpur District
Nadia	1. Krishnanagar Sadar; 2. Ranaghat; 3. Kushtia; 4. Meherpur; 5. Chuadanga	1,759,846	1,078,007	61.26	657,868	37.37	23,971	1.36	Divided between India and Pakistan	Krishnanagar Sadar; Ranaghat; Meherpur Subdivision (only Karimpur & Tehatta thanas ); Chuadanga Subdivision(only Krishnaganj)	★Nadia district	Kushtia; Meherpur except Karimpur & Tehatta; Chuadanga except Krishnaganj	★Kushtia District ★Meherpur District ★Chuadanga District
Noakhali	1. Noakhali Sadar; 2. Feni	2,217,402	1,803,937	81.35	412,261	18.59	1,204	0.05	Pakistan			Noakhali Sadar; Feni	★Noakhali District ★Feni District ★Lakshmipur District
Pabna	1. Pabna; 2. Sirajganj	1,705,072	1,313,968	77.06	383,755	22.50	7,349	0.43	Pakistan			Pabna; Sirajganj	★Pabna District ★Sirajganj District
Rajshahi	1. Rajshahi Sadar; 2. Naogaon; 3. Natore	1,571,750	1,173,285	74.65	389,880	24.80	8,585	0.55	Pakistan			Rajshahi Sadar; Naogaon; Natore	★Rajshahi District ★Natore District ★Naogaon District except Porsha, Patnitala, Dhamoihat, Sapahar Upazila
Rangpur	1. Rangpur sadar 2. Gaibandha; 3. Kurigram; 4. Nilphamari	2,877,847	2,055,186	71.41	802,849	27.90	19,812	0.69	Pakistan			Rangpur sadar; Gaibandha; Kurigram; Nilphamari	★Rangpur District ★Kurigram District ★Nilphamari District ★Gaibandha District ★Lalmonirhat District except Patgram Upazila
Tippera	1. Comilla; 2. Brahmanberia; 3. Chandpur	3,860,139	2,975,901	77.09	849,950	22.02	34,288	0.89	Pakistan			Comilla; Brahmanberia; Chandpur	★Comilla District ★Chandpur District ★Brahmanbaria District

== See also ==
- Bengali Hindu Homeland Movement
- Bengali Hindus in Assam
- United Bengal
- India–Bangladesh enclaves
- The Partition Museum, Amritsar
- The 1947 Partition Archive

== Sources ==
- Baxter, Craig (1997). Bangladesh: From a Nation to a State. Boulder, CO: Westview Press. ISBN 0-8133-2854-3.
- Bose, Sugata (1986). Agrarian Bengal: Economy, Social Structure and Politics. Cambridge University Press. ISBN 978-0-521-30448-1.
- Chakrabarty, Bidyut (2004). The Partition of Bengal and Assam, 1932-1947: Contour of Freedom. RoutledgeCurzon. ISBN 0-415-32889-6.
- Chatterji, Joya (2007). The Spoils of Partition: Bengal and India, 1947–1967. Cambridge University Press. ISBN 978-1-139-46830-5.
- Franda, Marcus F. (July 1970). "Communism and Regional Politics in East Pakistan". Asian Survey. 10 (7): 588–606. doi:10.2307/2642957. JSTOR 2642957.
- Fraser, Bashabi (2006). Bengal Partition Stories: An Unclosed Chapter. New York: Anthem Press. ISBN 978-1-84331-299-4.
- Harun-or-Rashid (2003). The Foreshadowing of Bangladesh: Bengal Muslim League and Muslim Politics, 1906-1947 (Rev. and enl. ed.). Dhaka: The University Press. ISBN 984-05-1688-4.
- Hill, K.; Seltzer, W.; Leaning, J.; Malik, S. J.; Russell, S. S. (2005). The Demographic Impact of Partition: Bengal in 1947. International Union for the Scientific Study of Population XXV International Population Conference, Tours, France, 18–23 July 2005. pp. 1–25. Archived from the original (PDF) on 1 September 2006.
- Islam, Sirajul, ed. (1992). History of Bangladesh: 1704 - 1971. Dhaka: Asiatic Society of Bangladesh. ISBN 984-512-337-6.
- Jalal, Ayesha (1994) [First published 1985]. The Sole Spokesman: Jinnah, the Muslim League and the Demand for Pakistan. Cambridge University Press. ISBN 978-0-521-24462-6.
- Mahmood, Safdar (1972). A Political Study of Pakistan. Lahore: Sh. Muhammad Ashraf. OCLC 12188985.
- McDermott, Rachel Fell; Gordon, Leonard A.; Embree, Ainslie T.; Pritchett, Frances W.; Dalton, Dennis, eds. (2014). Sources of Indian Traditions (3rd ed.). Columbia University Press. ISBN 978-0-231-13830-7.
- Roy, Anjali Gera; Bhatia, Nandi (2008). Partitioned lives : narratives of home, displacement, and resettlement. New Delhi: Dorling Kindersley (India). ISBN 9788131714164. Archived from the original on 6 October 2022.
- Schendel, Willem van (2005). The Bengal Borderland: Beyond State and Nation in South Asia. Anthem Press. ISBN 978-1-84331-145-4.
- Sen, Shila (1976). Muslim Politics in Bengal, 1937-1947. New Delhi: Impex India. OCLC 2799332.
- Shamshad, Rizwana (2017). Bangladeshi Migrants in India: Foreigners, Refugees, or Infiltrators?. New Delhi: Oxford University Press. ISBN 978-0-19-947641-1.
- Tripathi, Amales (1998). স্বাধীনতার মুখ [Svādhīnatāra mukha] (in Bengali). Ananda Publishers. ISBN 9788172157814.
- Ullah, Asma Zia (2013). "Abul Hashim: The Unsung Hero of the Freedom Movement". Pakistaniaat: A Journal of Pakistan Studies. 5 (2).
- Chattopadhyay, Subhasis (2016). "Review of Bengal Partition Stories: An Unclosed Chapter edited by Bashabi Fraser". Prabuddha Bharata or Awakened India. 121 (9): 670–672. ISSN 0032-6178. Archived from the original on 17 September 2016.
- Harun-or-Rashid (2012). "Suhrawardy, Huseyn Shaheed". In Islam, Sirajul; Jamal, Ahmed A. (eds.). Banglapedia: National Encyclopedia of Bangladesh (Second ed.). Asiatic Society of Bangladesh. Archived from the original on 7 March 2016.
- Harun-or-Rashid (2012). "Partition of Bengal, 1947". In Islam, Sirajul; Jamal, Ahmed A. (eds.). Banglapedia: National Encyclopedia of Bangladesh (Second ed.). Asiatic Society of Bangladesh. Archived from the original on 2 July 2015.
- Tan, Tai Yong; Kudaisya, Gyanesh (2000). The Aftermath of Partition in South Asia. Routledge. ISBN 0-415-17297-7.
- Prasad, Rajendra (1947). India Divided (3 ed.). Bombay: Hind Kitabs.
- Hashim S. Raza Mountbatten and the partition of India. New Delhi: Atlantic Publishers and Distributors, 1989. ISBN 81-7156-059-8
- Singh, J. J. (15 June 1947). "Partition of India: British Proposal Said to be Only Feasible Plan Now". The New York Times (Letter to editor). p. E8.
- Pandey, Gyanendra (2001). Remembering Partition: Violence, Nationalism, and History in India. Cambridge University Press. ISBN 0-521-00250-8.
- Mookerjea-Leonard, Debali. (2017). Literature, Gender, and the Trauma of Partition: The Paradox of Independence London and New York: Routledge. ISBN 978-1138183100
