= Hemtabad, Uttar Dinajpur =

Hemtabad
- Village
- Location in West Bengal, India# India Hemtabad (India)
- Coordinates: 25.6823°N 88.2206°E
- Country: India
- State: West Bengal
- District: Uttar Dinajpur

Population (2011)
  - Total: 3,810

Languages
  - Official: Bengali, English
- Time zone: UTC+5:30 (IST)
- Lok Sabha constituency: Raiganj
- Vidhan Sabha constituency: Hemtabad
- Website: uttardinajpur.nic.in

Hemtabad is a village in Hemtabad CD block in Raiganj subdivision of Uttar Dinajpur district in the state of West Bengal, India.

== Geography ==
Cities and towns in the Uttar Dinajpur district
M: municipal city/ town, CT: census town, R: rural/ urban centre, T: tourist centre
Owing to space constraints in the small map, the actual locations in a larger map may vary slightly

=== Location ===
Hemtabad is located at 25.6823°N 88.2206°E.

In the map alongside, all places marked on the map are linked in the full screen version.

=== Police station ===
Hemtabad police station under West Bengal police has jurisdiction over Hemtabad CD block. It is 8 km from the district headquarters and covers an area of 191.6 km^{2}.

=== CD block HQ ===
The headquarters of Hemtabad CD block is at Hemtabad village.

== Demographics ==
As per the 2011 Census of India, Hemtabad had a total population of 3,810, of which 1,941 (51%) were males and 1,869 (49%) were females. Population below 6 years was 445. The total number of literates in Hemtabad was 2,742 (81.49% of the population over 6 years)

== Transport ==
State Highway No. 10A, running from Buniadpur to Raiganj passes through Hemtabad.

== Healthcare ==
Hemtabad rural hospital at Hemtabad (with 30 beds) is the main medical facility in Hemtabad CD block.
