= Hemtabad =

- community development block
- Interactive map of Hemtabad
- Coordinates: 25.683333°N 88.216667°E
- Country: India
- State: West Bengal
- District: Uttar Dinajpur

Government
  - Type: Community development block

Area
  - Total: 191.82 km^{2} (74.06 sq mi)

Population (2011)
  - Total: 142,056
  - Density: 740.57/km^{2} (1,918.1/sq mi)

Languages
  - Official: Bengali, English
- Time zone: UTC+5:30 (IST)
- Lok Sabha constituency: Raiganj
- Vidhan Sabha constituency: Hemtabad
- Website: uttardinajpur.nic.in

Hemtabad is a community development block that forms an administrative division in Raiganj subdivision of Uttar Dinajpur district in the Indian state of West Bengal.

== History ==
Historically the western frontier of ancient Pundravardhana kingdom, bordering ancient Anga of Mahabharat fame, the Dinajpur area remained somewhat obscure in the major empires that held sway over the region and beyond till the rise of the Dinajpur Raj during the Mughal period. Some areas later forming a part of Uttar Dinajpur were parts of kingdoms in Nepal. Dinajpur district was constituted by the British in 1786, with a portion of the estate of Dinajpur Raj. Subsequent to the Permanent Settlement in 1793, the semi-independent Dinajpur Raj was further broken down and some of its tracts were transferred to the neighbouring British districts of Purnea, Malda, Rajshahi and Bogra. In 1947, the Radcliffe Line placed the Sadar and Thakurgaon subdivisions of Dinajpur district in East Pakistan. The Balurghat subdivision of Dinajpur district was reconstituted as West Dinajpur district in West Bengal. Raiganj subdivision was formed in 1948.

In order to restore territorial links between northern and southern parts of West Bengal which had been snapped during the partition of Bengal, and on the recommendations of the States Reorganisation Commission a portion of the erstwhile Kishanganj subdivision comprising Goalpokhar, Islampur and Chopra thanas (police stations) and parts of Thakurganj thana, along with the adjacent parts of the erstwhile Gopalpur thana in Katihar subdivision were transferred from Purnea district in Bihar to West Bengal in 1956, and were formally incorporated into Raiganj subdivision in West Dinajpur. The township of Kishanganj and its entire municipal boundary remained within Bihar. Islampur subdivision was formed in March 1959. At the same time, the portion of Chopra PS lying to the north of the Mahananda river covering an area that now comprises Bidhannagar-1 gram panchayat, Bidhannagar-2 GP, Chathat-Bansgaon GP and the southern half of Phansidewa-Bansgaon Kismat GP in Darjeeling district, was transferred from West Dinajpur to the jurisdiction of Phansidewa PS in Darjeling district. With the introduction of the Community Development Programme in 1960–61, community development blocks were set up in West Dinajpur district.

In 1992, West Dinajpur district was bifurcated and Uttar Dinajpur district was established.

== Geography ==
Hemtabad is located at 25°41′00″N 88°13′00″E.

Uttar Dinajpur district has a flat topography and slopes gently from north to south. All rivers flow in that direction. Except for the eastern fringes of Chopra CD Block, most of the district is a part of the catchment area of the Mahanada and also a part of the larger Barind Tract. The soil is composed of different varieties of alluvium. The main rivers are: Nagar, Mahananda, Kulik, Gamari, Chhiramati (Srimati) and Tangon. The rivers have little water in the dry season but with heavy rains, during monsoon, overflow the banks. The Kulik river flows through a portion of the boundary with Raiganj CD Block.

Hemtabad CD Block is bounded by Haripur, Ranisankail and Pirganj Upazilas in Thakurgaon District of Bangladesh on the north, Kaliaganj CD Block on the east and south and Raiganj CD Block on the west.

Approximately 206 km of the India-Bangladesh border is in Uttar Dinajpur district. It covers the eastern boundary of the district. On the western side Uttar Dinajpur district has 227 km boundary with Bihar.

Hemtabad CD Block has an area of 191.82 km^{2}.It has 1 panchayat samity, 5 gram panchayats, 87 gram sansads (village councils), 116 mouzas and 114 inhabited villages. Hemtabad police station serves this block. Headquarters of this CD Block is at Hemtabad.

Uttar Dinajpur district is one of the smaller districts in the state and stands 15th in terms of area (3,140.00 km^{2}) in the state.

Gram panchayats of Hemtabad block/ panchayat samiti are: Bangalbari, Bishnupur, Chainagar, Hemtabad, Naoda.

== Demographics ==
=== Population ===
As per the 2011 Census of India, Hemtabad CD Block had a total population of 142,056, all of which were rural. There were 72,624 (51%) males and 69,432 (49%) females. Population below 6 years was 19,968. Scheduled Castes numbered 49,446 (34.81%) and Scheduled Tribes numbered 6,491 (4.57%).

As per 2001 census, Hemtabad block had a total population of 118,815, out of which 61,236 were males and 57,579 were females. Hemtabad block registered a population growth of 24.86 per cent during the 1991-2001 decade. Decadal growth for the district was 28.72 per cent.

Large villages (with 4,000+ population) in Hemtabad CD Block were (2011 population in brackets): Kasimpur (4,188) and Shashan (4,559).

Other villages in Hemtabad CD Block included (2011 population in brackets): Hemtabad (3,810), Bangalbari (379), Naoda (3,434), Bishnupur (3,397) and Chainagar (2,662).

Decadal Population Growth Rate (%)

View source data.

Note: The CD Block data for 1971–1981, 1981-1991 and 1991-2001 is for Hemtabad PS covering the block

The decadal growth of population in Hemtabad CD Block in 2001-2011 was 19.55%. The decadal growth of population in Hemtabad PS in 1991-2001 was 24.87%, in 1981-91 was 22.18% and in 1971-81 was 25.61%. The decadal growth rate of population in Uttar Dinajpur district was as follows: 30.2% in 1971–81, 34.0% in 1981–91, 28.7% in 1991-2001 and 23.2% in 2001-11. The decadal growth rate for West Bengal was 13.93% in 2001–2011, 17.77% in 1991–2001, 24.73% in 1981-1991 and 23.17% in 1971-1981.

Uttar Dinajpur district has the highest decadal population growth rate in West Bengal with a figure of 23.2% for the decade 2001-2011 and is much higher than the state average of 13.8%.

According to the Human Development Report for Uttar Dinajpur district, population growth in the area that later became Uttar Dinajpur district was low in the pre-independence era and started picking up with the East Bengali refugees coming in from erstwhile East Pakistan. “A spurt in population growth rates first became evident between 1951–1961, and was further magnified between 1971-81 after the creation of Bangladesh when population growth in most districts bordering the Bangladesh-West Bengal frontier showed similar escalation. However, after 1981, when population growth in most other West Bengal districts had tapered off, growth rates in Uttar Dinajpur again showed a fresh spurt. Thus, no deceleration in population growth rates occurred in the district until after 1991… In addition to Hindu and tribal migrants from across the international border, a sizeable number of migrant Muslims have also settled in the district, mainly driven by economic reasons… migrants from other states comprised 23% of the total migrants residing in Uttar Dinajpur.” The large number of migrants from other states is mainly from the neighbouring areas in Bihar.

A study by North Bengal University has observed that “Immigrants from East Pakistan/Bangladesh have arrived in Uttar Dinajpur in almost equal numbers before and after 1971.” The Human Development Report opines, “The overall post-Partition impact on the rates of demographic growth has been particularly strong in all North Bengal districts. Despite its smaller relative size, the region has received more migration in pro rata terms than the West Bengal districts lying south of the Ganga.”

=== Literacy ===
As per the 2011 census, the total number of literates in Hemtabad CD Block was 82,874 (67.88% of the population over 6 years) out of which males numbered 45,939 (73.61% of the male population over 6 years) and females numbered 36,935 (61.91% of the female population over 6 years). The gender disparity (the difference between female and male literacy rates) was 11.70%.

The literacy rate in Uttar Dinajpur district at 60.13% in 2011, up from 47.89% in 2001, was the lowest amongst all districts of West Bengal. The highest literacy rate amongst the districts of West Bengal was that of Purba Medinipur district at 87.66% in 2011.

See also – List of West Bengal districts ranked by literacy rate

Literacy in CD blocks of
Uttar Dinajpur district
Raiganj subdivision
Raiganj – 63.52%
Hemtabad – 67.88%
Kaliaganj – 66.50%
Itahar – 58.95%
Islampur subdivision
Chopra – 59.90%
Islampur – 53.53%
Goalpokhar I – 42.26%
Goalpokhar II – 46.07%
Karandighi – 53.42%
Source: 2011 Census: CD Block Wise
Primary Census Abstract Data

=== Language and religion ===
Religion in Hemtabad CD Block (2011)
Islam	50.14%
Hinduism	49.25%
Other or not stated	0.61%

In the 2011 census, Muslims numbered 71,225 and formed 50.14% of the population in Hemtabad CD Block. Hindus numbered 69,957 and formed 49.25% of the population. Christians numbered 331 and formed 0.29% of the population. Others numbered 543 and formed 0.38% of the population. In Hemtabad CD Block, as per the District Statistical Handbook for Uttar Dinajpur, while the proportion of Muslims increased from 48.83% in 1991 to 50.24% in 2001, the proportion of Hindus declined from 50.01% in 1991 to 49.42% in 2001.

In the 2011 census, Uttar Dinajpur district had 1,501,170 Muslims who formed 49.92% of the population, 1,482,943 Hindus who formed 49.31% of the population, 16,702 Christians who formed 0.56% of the population and 6,319 persons belonging to other religions who formed 0.23% of the population. While the proportion of Muslim population in the district increased from 45.3% in 1991 to 49.9% in 2011, the proportion of Hindu population declined from 54.2% in 1991 to 49.2% in 2011.

Languages of Hemtabad CD block (2011)
1. Bengali (94.1%)
2. Santali (2.94%)
3. Others (2.94%)

At the time of the 2011 census, 94.12% of the population spoke Bengali and 2.94% Santali as their first language.

== Rural poverty ==
As per the Rural Household Survey conducted in 2002, 57.0% of the rural families in Hemtabad CD Block belonged to the BPL category, against 46.7% of rural families in Uttar Dinajpur district being in the BPL category. As per the Human Development Report for Uttar Dinajpur district, Hemtabad, ranks fourth in terms of Human Poverty Index (HPI), implying a higher concentration of poverty and partial exclusion of the poor from the human development gains recorded by other economic sections.

== Economy ==
=== Livelihood ===
Livelihood
in Hemtabad CD Block
1. Cultivators (24.2%)
2. Agricultural labourers (56.7%)
3. Household industries (1.98%)
4. Other Workers (17.1%)

In Hemtabad CD Block in 2011, amongst the class of total workers, cultivators numbered 14,537 and formed 24.24%, agricultural labourers numbered 33,994 and formed 56.67%, household industry workers numbered 1,190 and formed 1.90% and other workers numbered 10,260 and formed 17.11%. Total workers numbered 48,087 and formed 23.07% of the total population, and non-workers numbered 160,396 and formed 76.93% of the population.

Note: In the census records a person is considered a cultivator, if the person is engaged in cultivation/ supervision of land owned by self/government/institution. When a person who works on another person's land for wages in cash or kind or share, is regarded as an agricultural labourer. Household industry is defined as an industry conducted by one or more members of the family within the household or village, and one that does not qualify for registration as a factory under the Factories Act. Other workers are persons engaged in some economic activity other than cultivators, agricultural labourers and household workers. It includes factory, mining, plantation, transport and office workers, those engaged in business and commerce, teachers, entertainment artistes and so on.

=== Infrastructure ===
There are 114 inhabited villages in Hemtabad CD Block. All 114 villages (100%) have power supply. All 114 villages (100%) have drinking water supply. 14 villages (12.28%) have post offices. 112 villages (98.25%) have telephones (including landlines, public call offices and mobile phones). 67 villages (58.77%) have a pucca (paved) approach road and 30 villages (26.32%) have transport communication (includes bus service, rail facility and navigable waterways). 4 villages (3.21%) have agricultural credit societies. 4 villages (3.21%) have banks.

=== Agriculture ===
“With its distinctive physiographic and agroclimatic features, the Dinajpur region has been a bread-basket area of Bengal for many centuries, growing multiple varieties of fine and coarse rice in vast quantities, along with major economic crops like jute. The livelihood profile of Uttar Dinajpur district has evolved in association with these old agricultural patterns, and more than two-thirds of its active workforce still draws livelihoods directly from agriculture and related occupations.”

Agricultural potential has been uneven across Uttar Dinajpur based on soil conditions and irrigation potential. This has generated considerable internal migration within the district, as areas with higher agricultural potential and higher labour demand has attracted large number of people. The impact of land reforms has also varied. As the Islampur subdivision blocks evolved initially under the Bihar administration, the land estates were larger in size and the extent of land acquired under ceiling laws were higher. The cultivator population in Islampur subdivision was also thinner. Such conditions have been favourable for migrants. The movement of people from agricultural activities to non-agricultural activities has been low in Uttar Dinajpur district except for some pockets.

Hemtabad CD Block had 128 fertiliser depots, 23 seed stores and 25 fair price shops in 2013-14.

In 2013–14, Hemtabad CD Block produced 28,657 tonnes of Aman paddy, the main winter crop from 12,798 hectares, 42,245 tonnes of Boro paddy (spring crop) from 11,779 hectares, 4,229 tonnes of wheat from 1,447 hectares, 36,243 tonnes of jute from 2,754 hectares, and 34,143 tonnes of potatoes from 1,001 hectares. It also produced maskalai and oilseeds.

In 2013–14, the total area irrigated in Hemtabad CD Block was 915 hectares, out of which 155 hectares were irrigated by river lift irrigation and 760 hectares by deep tube wells.

=== Craft based activities ===
“More than eleven hundred rural households across the district are engaged in traditional crafts based industries, among which dhokra, mat making, terracotta, village pottery and bamboo craft in the Goalpokhar-1 and Kaliaganj regions are notable.”

=== Banking ===
In 2012–13, Hemtabad CD Block had offices of 3 commercial banks and 2 gramin banks.

=== Backward Regions Grant Fund ===
Uttar Dinajpur district is listed as a backward region and receives financial support from the Backward Regions Grant Fund. The fund, created by the Government of India, is designed to redress regional imbalances in development. As of 2012, 272 districts across the country were listed under this scheme. The list includes 11 districts of West Bengal.

== Transport ==
Hemtabad CD Block has 1 ferry service, 6 originating/ terminating bus routes.

The Barsoi-Radhikapur branch line passes through the Hemtabad CD Block and there is a station at Bamangram.

Assam Behar State Railway extended the metre gauge railway from Parbatipur, now in Bangladesh, to Katihar in 1889. With the partition of Bengal in 1947, the Indian side of the Barsoi-Parbatipur line became the Barsoi-Radhikapur branch line. It was converted to broad gauge in 2006.

State Highway No. 10A, running from Buniadpur to Raiganj passes through Hemtabad village and Hemtabad CD Block.

== Education ==
In 2012–13, Hemtabad CD Block had 86 primary schools with 10,240 students, 13 middle schools with 1,041 students, 3 high schools with 1,306 students and 16 higher secondary schools with 13,189 students. Hemtabad CD Block had 325 institutions for special and non-formal education with 13,484 students.

As per the 2011 census, in Hemtabad CD Block, amongst the 114 inhabited villages, 6 villages did not have a school, 80 villages had 1 or more primary schools, 28 villages had at least 1 primary and 1 middle school and 17 villages had at least 1 middle and 1 secondary school.

The mid-day meal programme for rural school children was launched in 2005 in Uttar Dinajpur district. As on 30 April 2015, 602,557 children in 3,006 schools were covered under this programme.

== Healthcare ==
In 2013, Hemtabad CD Block had 1 block primary health centre and 2 primary health centres, with total 46 beds and 3 doctors (excluding private bodies). It had 19 family welfare subcentres. 2,946 patients were treated indoor and 190,413 patients were treated outdoor in the hospitals, health centres and subcentres of the CD Block.

Hemtabad rural hospital at Hemtabad (with 30 beds) is the main medical facility in Hemtabad CD block. There are primary health centres at Bangalbari (with 10 beds), Baharail (with 6 beds).
