= Kasba, Uttar Dinajpur =

Kasba
- Census Town
- Location in West Bengal, India Kasba (India)
- Coordinates: 25.5856°N 88.1122°E
- Country: India
- State: West Bengal
- District: Uttar Dinajpur

Population (2011)
  - Total: 10,067

Languages
  - Official: Bengali, English
- Time zone: UTC+5:30 (IST)
- Vehicle registration: WB
- Website: uttardinajpur.nic.in

Kasba is a census town in Raiganj CD Block in Raiganj subdivision of Uttar Dinajpur district in the Indian state of West Bengal.

== Geography ==
Cities and towns in the Uttar Dinajpur district
M: municipal city/ town, CT: census town, R: rural/ urban centre, T: tourist centre
Owing to space constraints in the small map, the actual locations in a larger map may vary slightly

=== Location ===
Kasba is located at 25.5856°N 88.1122°E

== Demographics ==
As per the 2011 Census of India, Kasba had a total population of 10,067, of which 5,221 (52%) were males and 4,846 (48%) were females. Population below 6 years was 914. The total number of literates in Kasba was 7,695 (84.07% of the population over 6 years).

As of 2001 India census, Kasba had a population of 9,842. Males constitute 53% of the population and females 47%. Kasba has an average literacy rate of 73%, higher than the national average of 59.5%: male literacy is 79%, and female literacy is 67%. In Kasba, 11% of the population is under 6 years of age.
