= Nachhratpur Katabari =

- Census Town
- Location in West Bengal, India Nachhratpur Katabari (India)
- Coordinates: 25.61°N 88.10°E
- Country: India
- State: West Bengal
- District: Uttar Dinajpur

Population (2011)
  - Total: 6,011

Languages
  - Official: Bengali, English
- Time zone: UTC+5:30 (IST)
- Vehicle registration: WB
- Website: uttardinajpur.nic.in

Nachhratpur Katabari is a census town in Raiganj CD Block in Raiganj subdivision of Uttar Dinajpur district in the Indian state of West Bengal.

== Geography ==
Cities and towns in the Uttar Dinajpur district
M: municipal city/ town, CT: census town, R: rural/ urban centre, T: tourist centre
Owing to space constraints in the small map, the actual locations in a larger map may vary slightly

=== Location ===
Nachhrtpur Katbari is located at 25.61°N 88.10°E

== Demographics ==
As per the 2011 Census of India, Nachhratpur Katabari had a total population of 6,011, of which 3,124 (52%) were males and 2,887 (48%) were females. Population below 6 years was 673. The total number of literates in Nachhratpur Katabari was 4,129 (77.35% of the population over 6 years).

As of 2001 India census, Nachhratpur Katabari had a population of 5111. Males constitute 52% of the population and females 48%. Nachhratpur Katabari has an average literacy rate of 54%, lower than the national average of 59.5%: male literacy is 60%, and female literacy is 47%. In Nachhratpur Katabari, 15% of the population is under 6 years of age.
