= Itahar =

- Community development block
- Interactive map of Itahar
- Coordinates: 25.45°N 88.16°E
- Country: India
- State: West Bengal
- District: Uttar Dinajpur

Government
  - Type: Community development block

Area
  - Total: 362.40 km^{2} (139.92 sq mi)

Population (2011)
  - Total: 303,678
  - Density: 837.96/km^{2} (2,170.3/sq mi)

Languages
  - Official: Bengali, English, Hindi
- Time zone: UTC+5:30 (IST)
- ISO 3166 code: IN-WB
- Lok Sabha constituency: Balurghat
- Vidhan Sabha constituency: Itahar
- Website: uttardinajpur.nic.in

Itahar is a community development block that forms an administrative division in Raiganj subdivision of Uttar Dinajpur district in the Indian state of West Bengal.

== History ==
Historically the western frontier of ancient Pundravardhana kingdom, bordering ancient Anga of Mahabharat fame, the Dinajpur area remained somewhat obscure in the major empires that held sway over the region and beyond till the rise of the Dinajpur Raj during the Mughal period. Some areas later forming a part of Uttar Dinajpur were parts of kingdoms in Nepal. Dinajpur district was constituted by the British in 1786, with a portion of the estate of Dinajpur Raj. Subsequent to the Permanent Settlement in 1793, the semi-independent Dinajpur Raj was further broken down and some of its tracts were transferred to the neighbouring British districts of Purnea, Malda, Rajshahi and Bogra. In 1947, the Radcliffe Line placed the Sadar and Thakurgaon subdivisions of Dinajpur district in East Pakistan. The Balurghat subdivision of Dinajpur district was reconstituted as West Dinajpur district in West Bengal. Raiganj subdivision was formed in 1948.

In order to restore territorial links between northern and southern parts of West Bengal which had been snapped during the partition of Bengal, and on the recommendations of the States Reorganisation Commission a portion of the erstwhile Kishanganj subdivision comprising Goalpokhar, Islampur and Chopra thanas (police stations) and parts of Thakurganj thana, along with the adjacent parts of the erstwhile Gopalpur thana in Katihar subdivision were transferred from Purnea district in Bihar to West Bengal in 1956, and were formally incorporated into Raiganj subdivision in West Dinajpur. The township of Kishanganj and its entire municipal boundary remained within Bihar. Islampur subdivision was formed in March 1959. At the same time, the portion of Chopra PS lying to the north of the Mahananda river covering an area that now comprises Bidhannagar-1 gram panchayat, Bidhannagar-2 GP, Chathat-Bansgaon GP and the southern half of Phansidewa-Bansgaon Kismat GP in Darjeeling district, was transferred from West Dinajpur to the jurisdiction of Phansidewa PS in Darjeling district. With the introduction of the Community Development Programme in 1960-61, community development blocks were set up in West Dinajpur district.

In 1992, West Dinajpur district was bifurcated and Uttar Dinajpur district was established.

== Geography ==
Itahar is located at 25.45°N 88.16°E.

Uttar Dinajpur district has a flat topography and slopes gently from north to south. All rivers flow in that direction. Except for the eastern fringes of Chopra CD Block, most of the district is a part of the catchment area of the Mahanada and also a part of the larger Barind Tract. The soil is composed of different varieties of alluvium. The main rivers are: Nagar, Mahananda, Kulik, Gamari, Chhiramati (Srimati) and Tangon. The rivers have little water in the dry season but with heavy rains, during monsoon, overflow the banks. The Mahananda river flows along the western boundary of Itahar CD Block. The Chhiramati river covers a portion of the eastern boundary and the Gamari river flows through Itahar CD Block.

Itahar CD Block is bounded by Raiganj and Kaliaganj CD Blocks on the north, Harirampur CD Block, in Dakshin Dinajpur district, on the east, Gazole CD Block, in Malda district, on the south, Chanchal II, Chanchal I CD Blocks in Malda district and Barsoi CD Block in Katihar district of Bihar on the west.

Approximately 206 km of the India-Bangladesh border is in Uttar Dinajpur district. It covers the eastern boundary of the district. On the western side Uttar Dinajpur district has 227 km boundary with Bihar.

Itahar CD Block has an area of 362.40 km^{2}.It has 1 panchayat samity, 12 gram panchayats, 194 gram sansads (village councils), 217 mouzas and 219 inhabited villages. Itahar police station serves this block. Headquarters of this CD Block is at Itahar.

Uttar Dinajpur district is one of the smaller districts in the state and stands 15th in terms of area (3,140.00 km^{2}) in the state.

Gram panchayats of Itahar block/ panchayat samiti are: Chhayghara, Durgapur, Durlovpur, Gulandar I, Gulandar II, Itahar, Jayhat, Kapasia, Marnai, Patirajpur, Sarun I and Sarun II.

== Demographics ==
=== Population ===
As per the 2011 Census of India, Itahar CD Block had a total population of 303,678, of which 297,656 were rural and 6,022 were urban. There were 155,777 (51%) males and 147,901 (49%) females. Population below 6 years was 43,549. Scheduled Castes numbered 78.177 (25.74%) and Scheduled Tribes numbered 25,134 (8.28%).

As per the 2001 census, Itahar block had a total population of 249,500, out of which 127,332 were males and 122,168 were females. Itahar block registered a population growth of 26.58 per cent during the 1991-2001 decade. Decadal growth for the district was 28.72 per cent.

The only census town in Itahar CD Block was (2011 population in brackets): Itahar (6,022).

Large villages (with 4,000+ population) in Itahar CD Block were (2011 population in brackets): Gorahar (4,823), Keotal (4,655), Dhulahar (5,681), Gulandar (4,105), Kapsia (10,159), Barot (4,394), Bangar (4,512) and Khesra (5,617).

Other villages in Itahar CD Block included (2011 population in brackets): Jayhat (3,957), Chhayghara (2001) and Durgapur (2,191).

Decadal Population Growth Rate (%)

View source data.

Note: The CD Block data for 1971-1981, 1981-1991 and 1991-2001 is for Itahar PS covering the block

The decadal growth of population in Itahar CD Block in 2001-2011 was 19.28%. The decadal growth of population in Itahar PS in 1991-2001 was 10.03%, in 1981-91 was 24.63% and in 1971-81 was 27.39%. The decadal growth rate of population in Uttar Dinajpur district was as follows: 30.2% in 1971-81, 34.0% in 1981-91, 28.7% in 1991-2001 and 23.2% in 2001-11. The decadal growth rate for West Bengal was 13.93% in 2001-2011, 17.77% in 1991-2001. 24.73% in 1981-1991 and 23.17% in 1971-1981.

Uttar Dinajpur district has the highest decadal population growth rate in West Bengal with a figure of 23.2% for the decade 2001-2011 and is much higher than the state average of 13.8%.

According to the Human Development Report for Uttar Dinajpur district, population growth in the area that later became Uttar Dinajpur district was low in the pre-independence era and started picking up with the waves of East Bengali refugees coming in from erstwhile East Pakistan. "A spurt in population growth rates first became evident between 1951-1961, and was further magnified between 1971-81 after the creation of Bangladesh when population growth in most districts bordering the Bangladesh-West Bengal frontier showed similar escalation. However, after 1981, when population growth in most other West Bengal districts had tapered off, growth rates in Uttar Dinajpur again showed a fresh spurt. Thus, no deceleration in population growth rates occurred in the district until after 1991… In addition to Hindu and tribal migrants from across the international border, a sizeable number of migrant Muslims have also settled in the district, mainly driven by economic reasons… migrants from other states comprised 23% of the total migrants residing in Uttar Dinajpur." The large number of migrants from other states is mainly from the neighbouring areas in Bihar.

A study by North Bengal University has observed that "Immigrants from East Pakistan/Bangladesh have arrived in Uttar Dinajpur in almost equal numbers before and after 1971." The Human Development Report opines, "The overall post-Partition impact on the rates of demographic growth has been particularly strong in all North Bengal districts. Despite its smaller relative size, the region has received more migration in pro rata terms than the West Bengal districts lying south of the Ganga."

=== Literacy ===
As per the 2011 census, the total number of literates in Itahar CD Block was 153,345 (58.95% of the population over 6 years) out of which males numbered 86,345 (64.68% of the male population over 6 years) and females numbered 67,000 (52.90% of the female population over 6 years). The gender disparity (the difference between female and male literacy rates) was 11.78%.

The literacy rate in Uttar Dinajpur district at 60.13% in 2011, up from 47.89% in 2001, was the lowest amongst all districts of West Bengal. The highest literacy rate amongst the districts of West Bengal was that of Purba Medinipur district at 87.66% in 2011.

See also – List of West Bengal districts ranked by literacy rate

Literacy in CD blocks of
Uttar Dinajpur district
Raiganj subdivision
Raiganj – 63.52%
Hemtabad – 67.88%
Kaliaganj – 66.50%
Itahar – 58.95%
Islampur subdivision
Chopra – 59.90%
Islampur – 53.53%
Goalpokhar I – 42.26%
Goalpokhar II – 46.07%
Karandighi – 53.42%
Source: 2011 Census: CD Block Wise
Primary Census Abstract Data

=== Language and religion ===
Religion in Itahar CD Block (2011)
Islam	51.98%
Hinduism	47.43%
Christianity	0.43%
Other or not stated	0.16%

In the 2011 census, Muslims numbered 157,855 and formed 51.98% of the population in Itahar CD Block. Hindus numbered 144,049 and formed 47.43% of the population. Christians numbered 1,295 and formed 0.43% of the population. Others numbered 479 and formed 0.16% of the population. In Itahar CD Block, as per the District Statistical Handbook for Uttar Dinajpur, while the proportion of Muslims increased from 47.17% in 1991 to 48.18% in 2001, the proportion of Hindus declined from 52.61% in 1991 to 50.04% in 2001.

In the 2011 census, Uttar Dinajpur district had 1,501,170 Muslims who formed 49.92% of the population, 1,482,943 Hindus who formed 49.31% of the population, 16,702 Christians who formed 0.56% of the population and 6,319 persons belonging to other religions who formed 0.23% of the population. While the proportion of Muslim population in the district increased from 45.3% in 1991 to 49.9% in 2011, the proportion of Hindu population declined from 54.2% in 1991 to 49.2% in 2011.

Languages of Itahar CD block (2011)
1. Bengali (90.8%)
2. Santali (6.35%)
3. 'Other' Bengali (0.99%)
4. Others (1.81%)

At the time of the 2011 census, 90.85% of the population spoke Bengali and 6.35% Santali as their first language. 0.99% of the population recorded their language as 'Others' under Bengali in the census.

== Rural poverty ==
As per the Rural Household Survey conducted in 2002, 64.9% of the rural families in Itahar CD Block belonged to the BPL category, against 46.7% of rural families in Uttar Dinajpur district being in the BPL category. As per the Human Development Report for Uttar Dinajpur district, poverty and exclusion levels are very high in Itahar, which ranks fifth in terms of Human Development Index (HDI) but ascends to the second rank in terms of Human Poverty Index (HPI).

== Economy ==
=== Livelihood ===
Livelihood
in Itahar CD Block
1. Cultivators (30.5%)
2. Agricultural labourers (52.1%)
3. Household industries (1.88%)
4. Other Workers (15.4%)

In Itahar CD Block in 2011, amongst the class of total workers, cultivators numbered 35,419 and formed 30.52%, agricultural labourers numbered 60,512 and formed 52.14%, household industry workers numbered 2,187 and formed 1.88% and other workers numbered 17,930 and formed 15.45%. Total workers numbered 116,048 and formed 38.21% of the total population, and non-workers numbered 187,630 and formed 61.79% of the population.

Note: In the census records a person is considered a cultivator, if the person is engaged in cultivation/ supervision of land owned by self/government/institution. When a person who works on another person's land for wages in cash or kind or share, is regarded as an agricultural labourer. Household industry is defined as an industry conducted by one or more members of the family within the household or village, and one that does not qualify for registration as a factory under the Factories Act. Other workers are persons engaged in some economic activity other than cultivators, agricultural labourers and household workers. It includes factory, mining, plantation, transport and office workers, those engaged in business and commerce, teachers, entertainment artistes and so on.

=== Infrastructure ===
There are 219 inhabited villages in Itahar CD Block. All 219 villages (100%) have power supply. 218 villages (99.54%) have drinking water supply. 21 villages (9.59%) have post offices. 213 villages (97.26%) have telephones (including landlines, public call offices and mobile phones). 106 (48.4%) villages have a pucca (paved) approach road and 92 villages (42.01%) have transport communication (includes bus service, rail facility and navigable waterways). 13 villages (5.94%) have agricultural credit societies. 5 villages (2.28%) have banks.

=== Agriculture ===
"With its distinctive physiographic and agroclimatic features, the Dinajpur region has been a bread-basket area of Bengal for many centuries, growing multiple varieties of fine and coarse rice in vast quantities, along with major economic crops like jute. The livelihood profile of Uttar Dinajpur district has evolved in association with these old agricultural patterns, and more than two-thirds of its active workforce still draws livelihoods directly from agriculture and related occupations."

Agricultural potential has been uneven across Uttar Dinajpur based on soil conditions and irrigation potential. This has generated considerable internal migration within the district, as areas with higher agricultural potential and higher labour demand has attracted large number of people. The impact of land reforms has also varied. As the Islampur subdivision blocks evolved initially under the Bihar administration, the land estates were larger in size and the extent of land acquired under ceiling laws were higher. The cultivator population in Islampur subdivision was also thinner. Such conditions have been favourable for migrants. The movement of people from agricultural activities to non-agricultural activities has been low in Uttar Dinajpur district except for some pockets.

Itahar CD Block had 360 fertiliser depots, 14 seed stores and 60 fair price shops in 2013-14.

In 2013-14, Itahar CD Block produced 69,331 tonnes of Aman paddy, the main winter crop from 24,672 hectares, 32,654 tonnes of Boro paddy (spring crop) from 13,655 hectares, 13,912 tonnes of wheat from 5,412 hectares, 70,949 tonnes of jute from 5,517 hectares, 36,083 tonnes of potatoes from 857 hectares, 26,978 tonnes of sugar cane from 258 hectares. It also produced maskalai and oilseeds.

In 2013-14, the total area irrigated in Itahar CD Block was 934 hectares, out of which 345 hectares were irrigated by river lift irrigation and 589 hectares by deep tube wells.

=== Craft based activities ===
"More than eleven hundred rural households across the district are engaged in traditional crafts based industries, among which dhokra, mat making, terracotta, village pottery and bamboo craft in the Goalpokhar-1 and Kaliaganj regions are notable."

=== Banking ===
In 2012-13, Itahar CD Block had offices of 3 commercial banks and 5 gramin banks.

=== Backward Regions Grant Fund ===
Uttar Dinajpur district is listed as a backward region and receives financial support from the Backward Regions Grant Fund. The fund, created by the Government of India, is designed to redress regional imbalances in development. As of 2012, 272 districts across the country were listed under this scheme. The list includes 11 districts of West Bengal.

== Transport ==
Itahar CD Block has 8 ferry services, 7 originating/ terminating bus routes. The nearest railway station is 22 km from the block headquarters.

New broad gauge lines – Gazole-Itahar (27.20 km), Itahar-Raiganj (22.16 km) and Itahar-Buniadpur (27.095 km) – as a material modification of the Eklakhi-Balurghat project (commissioned in 2004) was included in the budget 1983-84. Initial work for the lines has been taken up by Northeast Frontier Railway. 431.973 ha of land is to be acquired. Land acquisition has commenced in the Gazole-Itahar sector with initial fund sanctions. As of August 2018, further sanctions are awaited. The Eklakhi–Balurghat branch line was taken up in 1983-84.

National Highway 12 (old number NH 34) passes through Itahar town and Itahar CD Block.

Construction of a bridge on the Mahananda connecting Itahar in Uttar Dinajpur district with Chanchal in Malda was taken up in 1999 but has been delayed.

== Education ==
In 2012-13, Itahar CD Block had 174 primary schools with 25,417 students, 24 middle schools with 1,737 students, 4 high schools with 3,312 students and 28 higher secondary schools with 31,321 students. Kaliaganj CD Block had 1 general degree college with 2,799 students,1 technical /professional institutions with 100 students and 562 institutions for special and non-formal education with 36,786 students.

As per the 2011 census, in Itahar CD Block, amongst the 219 inhabited villages, 30 villages did not have a school, 147 villages had 1 or more primary schools, 42 villages had at least 1 primary and 1 middle school and 18 villages had at least 1 middle and 1 secondary school.

The mid-day meal programme for rural school children was launched in 2005 in Uttar Dinajpur district. As on 30 April 2015, 602,557 children in 3,006 schools were covered under this programme.

=== College ===
- Dr. Meghnad Saha College was established in 2000 at Village: Ranipur, PO Tilna, PS Itahar.
- Durgapur Women's College, (affiliated to Raiganj University). Durgapur, Itahar
- Itahar Government Polytechnic, near Porsha, Itahar.
- Itahar Government ITI, near Durgapur, Itahar.
- Itahar Ideal Teachers Training (Dl.Ed. & B.Ed.) College.
- Moulana Abul Kalam Azad B.Ed. College was established in 2005 at Village: Bagbari, PO Itahar.

== Healthcare ==
During the 2008 bird flu outbreak in West Bengal, 16,000 birds were destroyed in Gualadar and Surun gram panchayats, which fall under the jurisdiction of Itahar police station. Some villagers refused to kill their birds and health workers had to retreat from those villages.

In 2013, Itahar CD Block had 1 block primary health centre and 3 primary health centres, with total 52 beds and 3 doctors (excluding private bodies). It had 42 family welfare subcentres. 3,038 patients were treated indoor and 308,871 patients were treated outdoor in the hospitals, health centres and subcentres of the CD Block.

Itahar rural hospital at Itahar (with 30 beds) is the main medical facility in Itahar CD block. There are primary health centres at Marani (with 10 beds), Churaman (with 6 beds), Paraharipur (Surun PHC) (with 6 beds).
