= Raiganj (community development block) =

- Community development block
- Interactive map of Raiganj
- Coordinates: 25.62°N 88.12°E
- Country: India
- State: West Bengal
- District: Uttar Dinajpur
- Established: 1 April 1992

Area
  - Total: 472.13 km^{2} (182.29 sq mi)

Population (2011)
  - Total: 430,221
  - Density: 911.23/km^{2} (2,360.1/sq mi)

Languages
  - Official: Bengali, English
- Time zone: UTC+5:30 (IST)
- Lok Sabha constituency: Raiganj
- Vidhan Sabha constituency: Raiganj, Hemtabad, Kaliaganj
- Website: uttardinajpur.nic.in

Raiganj is a community development block that forms an administrative division in Raiganj subdivision of Uttar Dinajpur district in the Indian state of West Bengal.

== History ==
Historically the western frontier of ancient Pundravardhana kingdom, bordering ancient Anga of Mahabharat fame, the Dinajpur area remained somewhat obscure in the major empires that held sway over the region and beyond till the rise of the Dinajpur Raj during the Mughal period. Some areas later forming a part of Uttar Dinajpur were parts of kingdoms in Nepal. Dinajpur district was constituted by the British in 1786, with a portion of the estate of Dinajpur Raj. Subsequent to the Permanent Settlement in 1793, the semi-independent Dinajpur Raj was further broken down and some of its tracts were transferred to the neighbouring British districts of Purnea, Malda, Rajshahi and Bogra. In 1947, the Radcliffe Line placed the Sadar and Thakurgaon subdivisions of Dinajpur district in East Pakistan. The Balurghat subdivision of Dinajpur district was reconstituted as West Dinajpur district in West Bengal. Raiganj subdivision was formed in 1948.

In order to restore territorial links between northern and southern parts of West Bengal which had been snapped during the partition of Bengal, and on the recommendations of the States Reorganisation Commission a portion of the erstwhile Kishanganj subdivision comprising Goalpokhar, Islampur and Chopra thanas (police stations) and parts of Thakurganj thana, along with the adjacent parts of the erstwhile Gopalpur thana in Katihar subdivision were transferred from Purnea district in Bihar to West Bengal in 1956, and were formally incorporated into Raiganj subdivision in West Dinajpur. The township of Kishanganj and its entire municipal boundary remained within Bihar. Islampur subdivision was formed in March 1959. At the same time, the portion of Chopra PS lying to the north of the Mahananda river covering an area that now comprises Bidhannagar-1 gram panchayat, Bidhannagar-2 GP, Chathat-Bansgaon GP and the southern half of Phansidewa-Bansgaon Kismat GP in Darjeeling district, was transferred from West Dinajpur to the jurisdiction of Phansidewa PS in Darjeling district. With the introduction of the Community Development Programme in 1960–61, community development blocks were set up in West Dinajpur district.

In 1992, West Dinajpur district was bifurcated and Uttar Dinajpur district was established.

== Geography ==
Raiganj is located at 25°37′N 88°07′E.

Uttar Dinajpur district has a flat topography and slopes gently from north to south. All rivers flow in that direction. Except for the eastern fringes of Chopra CD Block, most of the district is a part of the catchment area of the Mahanada and also a part of the larger Barind Tract. The soil is composed of different varieties of alluvium. The main rivers are: Nagar, Mahananda, Kulik, Gamari, Chhiramati (Srimati) and Tangon. The rivers have little water in the dry season but with heavy rains, during monsoon, overflow the banks. The Nagar River flows in the eastern part of the CD Block and Kulik river flows along the western boundary eastern boundary with Hemtabad CD Block and then though the Raiganj CD Block.

Raiganj CD Block is bounded by Haripur Upazila in Thakurgaon District of Bangladesh on the north, Hemtabad and Kaliaganj CD Blocks on the east, Itahar CD Block on the south and Barsoi CD Block in Katihar district of Bihar on the west.

Approximately 206 km of the India-Bangladesh border is in Uttar Dinajpur district. It covers the eastern boundary of the district. On the western side Uttar Dinajpur district has 227 km boundary with Bihar.

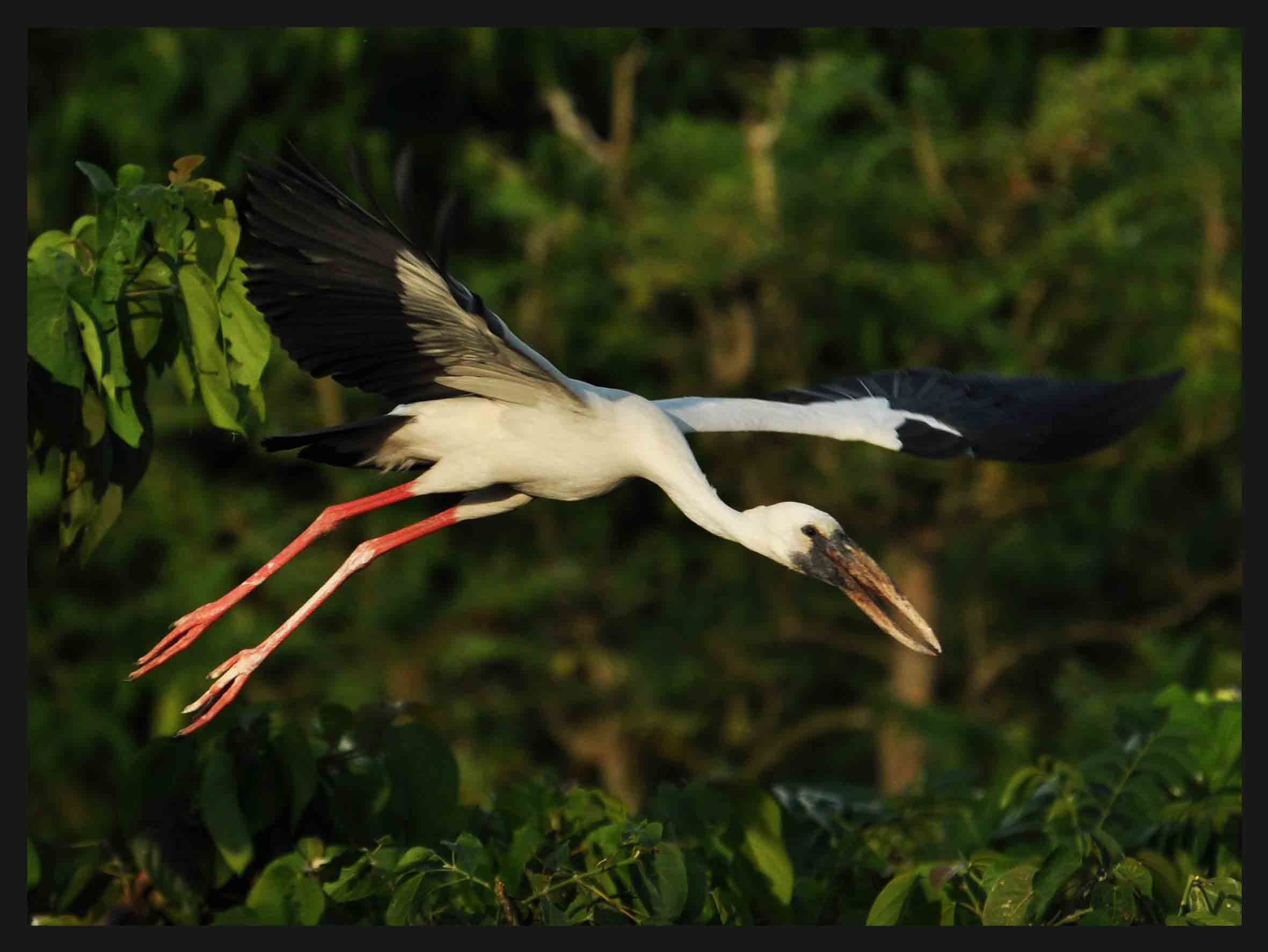
Openbill stork at Raiganj Wildlife Sanctuary

Raiganj Wildlife Sanctuary, also known as Kulick Bird Sanctuary, is the largest breeding colony in the world for the open bill stork. It is home to 164 species of birds and 80,000 migratory birds visit it every year.

Tourist attractions in Raiganj CD Block are: Durgapur Rajbari, Raiganj bird sanctuary, Bairabi temple at Bindole, Bahin Rajbari, Durga Mandir at Maharajahat, Durga Mandir at Halalpur, Tarohat Kali Mandir at Maslandapur, Karnajora Park, Radha Gobindo Mandir at Maharajahat

Raiganj CD Block has an area of 472.13 km^{2}.It has 1 panchayat samity, 14 gram panchayats, 279 gram sansads (village councils), 222 mouzas and 221 inhabited villages. Raiganj police station serves this block. Headquarters of this CD Block is at PO Sudarshanpur, Raiganj.

Uttar Dinajpur district is one of the smaller districts in the state and stands 15th in terms of area (3,140.00 km^{2}) in the state.

Gram panchayats of Raiganj block/ panchayat samiti are: Bahin, Baruna, Bhatun, Bindole, 11 NO Birghoi, Gouri, Jagadishpur, Kamalabari I, Kamalabari II, Mahipur, Maraikura, Rampur Maharajahat, Sherpur and Sitgram.

== Demographics ==
=== Population ===
As per the 2011 Census of India, Raiganj CD Block had a total population of 430,221, of which 414,143 were rural and 16,078 were urban. There were 221,738 (52%) males and 208,483 (48%) females. Population below 6 years was 61,515. Scheduled Castes numbered 163,662 (38.04%) and Scheduled Tribes numbered 27,785 (6.46%).

As per 2001 census, Raiganj block had a total population of 362,285, out of which 187,183 were males and 175,102 were females. Raiganj block registered a population growth of 30.71 per cent during the 1991-2001 decade. Decadal growth for the district was 28.72 per cent.

Census towns in Raiganj CD Block were (2011 population in brackets): Nachhratpur Katabari (6,011) and Kasba (10,067).

Large villages (with 4,000+ population) in Raiganj CD Block were (2011 population in brackets):Rupahar (4,155), Bhomra (5,539), Chhatrapur (4,138), Chhota Parua (5,258), Barabarua (6,198), Kasba Mahaso (4,368), Serpur (5,624), Karnajora (6,858), Dakshin Goalpara (5,648), Gauri (4,588), Soharai (4,449), Rampur (4,759), Dwipnagar (5,116), Sitgram (6,167), Sariabad (8,477), Runia (4,024), Adiar (5,834), Lakshmania (9,156), Jagadishpur (6,237), Malibari (4,219), Bhatol (5,135) and Gopalpur (5,618).

Other villages in Raiganj CD Block included (2011 population in brackets): Bindol (1,486), Bahin (2,793), Birghai (2,126), Maraikura (917) and Mahipur (1,585).

Decadal Population Growth Rate (%)

Note: The CD Block data for 1971–1981, 1981-1991 and 1991-2001 is for Raiganj PS covering the block

The decadal growth of population in Raiganj CD Block in 2001-2011 was 18.83%. The decadal growth of population in Raiganj PS in 1991-2001 was 23.14%, in 1981-91 was 57,70% and in 1971-81 was 30.37%. The decadal growth rate of population in Uttar Dinajpur district was as follows: 30.2% in 1971–81, 34.0% in 1981–91, 28.7% in 1991-2001 and 23.2% in 2001–11. The decadal growth rate for West Bengal was 13.93% in 2001–2011, 17.77% in 1991–2001, 24.73% in 1981-1991 and 23.17% in 1971–1981.

Uttar Dinajpur district has the highest decadal population growth rate in West Bengal with a figure of 23.2% for the decade 2001-2011 and is much higher than the state average of 13.8%.

According to the Human Development Report for Uttar Dinajpur district, population growth in the area that later became Uttar Dinajpur district was low in the pre-independence era and started picking up with waves of East Bengali refugees coming in from erstwhile East Pakistan. "A spurt in population growth rates first became evident between 1951-1961, and was further magnified between 1971-81 after the creation of Bangladesh when population growth in most districts bordering the Bangladesh-West Bengal frontier showed similar escalation. However, after 1981, when population growth in most other West Bengal districts had tapered off, growth rates in Uttar Dinajpur again showed a fresh spurt. Thus, no deceleration in population growth rates occurred in the district until after 1991… In addition to Hindu and tribal migrants from across the international border, a sizeable number of migrant Muslims have also settled in the district, mainly driven by economic reasons… migrants from other states comprised 23% of the total migrants residing in Uttar Dinajpur." The large number of migrants from other states is mainly from the neighbouring areas in Bihar.

A study by North Bengal University has observed that "Immigrants from East Pakistan/Bangladesh have arrived in Uttar Dinajpur in almost equal numbers before and after 1971." The Human Development Report opines, "The overall post-Partition impact on the rates of demographic growth has been particularly strong in all North Bengal districts. Despite its smaller relative size, the region has received more migration in pro rata terms than the West Bengal districts lying south of the Ganga."

=== Literacy ===
As per the 2011 census, the total number of literates in Raiganj CD Block was 234,192 (63.52% of the population over 6 years) out of which males numbered 133,461 (70.23% of the male population over 6 years) and females numbered 100,731 (56.37% of the female population over 6 years). The gender disparity (the difference between female and male literacy rates) was 13.86%.

The literacy rate in Uttar Dinajpur district at 60.13% in 2011, up from 47.89% in 2001, was the lowest amongst all districts of West Bengal. The highest literacy rate amongst the districts of West Bengal was that of Purba Medinipur district at 87.66% in 2011.

See also – List of West Bengal districts ranked by literacy rate

Literacy in CD blocks of
Uttar Dinajpur district
Raiganj subdivision
Raiganj – 63.52%
Hemtabad – 67.88%
Kaliaganj – 66.50%
Itahar – 58.95%
Islampur subdivision
Chopra – 59.90%
Islampur – 53.53%
Goalpokhar I – 42.26%
Goalpokhar II – 46.07%
Karandighi – 53.42%
Source: 2011 Census: CD Block Wise
Primary Census Abstract Data

=== Language and religion ===
Religion in Raiganj CD Block (2011)
Hinduism	65.13%
Islam	34.14%
Christianity	0.48%
Other or not stated	0.25%

In the 2011 census, Hindus numbered 280,214 and formed 65.13% of the population in Raiganj CD Block. Muslims numbered 146,871 and formed 34.14% of the population. Christians numbered 2,075 and formed 0.48% of the population. Others numbered 1,061 and formed 0.25% of the population. In Raiganj CD Block, as per the District Statistical Handbook for Uttar Dinajpur, while the proportion of Muslims increased from 31.08% in 1991 to 32.78% in 2001, the proportion of Hindus declined from 68.45% in 1991 to 66.43% in 2001.

In the 2011 census, Uttar Dinajpur district had 1,501,170 Muslims who formed 49.92% of the population, 1,482,943 Hindus who formed 49.31% of the population, 16,702 Christians who formed 0.56% of the population and 6,319 persons belonging to other religions who formed 0.23% of the population. While the proportion of Muslim population in the district increased from 45.3% in 1991 to 49.9% in 2011, the proportion of Hindu population declined from 54.2% in 1991 to 49.2% in 2011.

Languages of Raiganj CD block (2011)
1. Bengali (86.3%)
2. Santali (3.86%)
3. Rajbongshi (2.90%)
4. Hindi (2.28%)
5. 'Other' Bengali (1.41%)
6. Others (3.25%)

At the time of the 2011 census, 86.30% of the population spoke Bengali, 3.86% Santali, 2.90% Rajbongshi and 2.28% Hindi as their first language. 1.41% of the population recorded their language as 'Others' under Bengali in the census.

== Rural poverty ==
As per the Rural Household Survey conducted in 2002, 27.0% of the rural families in Raiganj CD Block belonged to the BPL category, against 46.7% of rural families in Uttar Dinajpur district being in the BPL category. As per the Human Development Report for Uttar Dinajpur district, "The headquarters block of Raiganj, which ranked fourth in terms of Human Development Index (HDI) but offered the best livelihood opportunities in rural Uttar Dinajpur, accordingly, has a low concentration of poverty… Kaliaganj and Raiganj form a pocket of low human poverty. Exclusion and human poverty is otherwise widely present in the other blocks of Uttar Dinajpur".

== Economy ==
=== Livelihood ===
Livelihood
in Raiganj CD Block
1. Cultivators (23.9%)
2. Agricultural labourers (43.8%)
3. Household industries (3.71%)
4. Other Workers (28.6%)

In Raiganj CD Block in 2011, amongst the class of total workers, cultivators numbered 40,441 and formed 23.86%, agricultural labourers numbered 74,241 and formed 43.81%, household industry workers numbered 6,280 and formed 3.71% and other workers numbered 48,516 and formed 28.62%. Total workers numbered 169,472 and formed 39.39% of the total population, and non-workers numbered 260,749 and formed 60.61% of the population.

Note: In the census records a person is considered a cultivator, if the person is engaged in cultivation/ supervision of land owned by self/government/institution. When a person who works on another person's land for wages in cash or kind or share, is regarded as an agricultural labourer. Household industry is defined as an industry conducted by one or more members of the family within the household or village, and one that does not qualify for registration as a factory under the Factories Act. Other workers are persons engaged in some economic activity other than cultivators, agricultural labourers and household workers. It includes factory, mining, plantation, transport and office workers, those engaged in business and commerce, teachers, entertainment artistes and so on.

=== Infrastructure ===
There are 221 inhabited villages in Raiganj CD Block. All 221 villages (100%) have power supply. 219 villages (99.10%) have drinking water supply. 30 villages (13.57%) have post offices. 220 villages (99.55%) have telephones (including landlines, public call offices and mobile phones). 70 villages (31.67%) have a pucca (paved) approach road and 52 villages (23.53%) have transport communication (includes bus service, rail facility and navigable waterways). 8 villages (3.62%) have agricultural credit societies. 18 villages (8.14%) have banks.

=== Market ===
Kamlabari Hat, Raiganj Kisak Bazar, Bogram Hat, Maharaja Hat, Mohiniganj Hat, Baroduari Hat, Rupahar Hat, Panisala Hat

=== Agriculture ===
"With its distinctive physiographic and agroclimatic features, the Dinajpur region has been a bread-basket area of Bengal for many centuries, growing multiple varieties of fine and coarse rice in vast quantities, along with major economic crops like jute. The livelihood profile of Uttar Dinajpur district has evolved in association with these old agricultural patterns, and more than two-thirds of its active workforce still draws livelihoods directly from agriculture and related occupations."

Agricultural potential has been uneven across Uttar Dinajpur based on soil conditions and irrigation potential. This has generated considerable internal migration within the district, as areas with higher agricultural potential and higher labour demand has attracted large number of people. The impact of land reforms has also varied. As the Islampur subdivision blocks evolved initially under the Bihar administration, the land estates were larger in size and the extent of land acquired under ceiling laws were higher. The cultivator population in Islampur subdivision was also thinner. Such conditions have been favourable for migrants. The movement of people from agricultural activities to non-agricultural activities has been low in Uttar Dinajpur district except for some pockets.

Raiganj CD Block had 272 fertiliser depots, 137 seed stores and 72 fair price shops in 2013–14.

In 2013–14, Raiganj CD Block produced 79,500 tonnes of Aman paddy, the main winter crop from 30,502 hectares, 13,411 tonnes of Boro paddy (spring crop) from 5,325 hectares, 258 tonnes of Aus paddy (summer crop) from 145 hectares, 17,277 tonnes of wheat from 6,489 hectares, 954 tonnes of maize from 392 hectares, 104,043 tonnes of jute from 7,893 hectares, 24,926 tonnes of potatoes from 1,076 hectares and 41,827 tonnes of sugar cane from 400 hectares. It also produced pulses and oilseeds.

In 2013–14, the total area irrigated in Raiganj CD Block was 1,111 hectares, out of which 259 hectares were irrigated by river lift irrigation, 780 hectares by deep tube wells and 72 hectares by shallow tube wells.

=== Craft based activities ===
"More than eleven hundred rural households across the district are engaged in traditional crafts based industries, among which dhokra, mat making, terracotta, village pottery and bamboo craft in the Goalpokhar-1 and Kaliaganj regions are notable."

=== Industry ===
West Dinajpur Spinning Mills Ltd. was established at Village Bogram, PO Karanjora, in 1975. Its line of business includes preparation and spinning of silk fiber including blended silk.

=== Banking ===
In 2012–13, Raiganj CD Block had offices of 10 commercial banks and 5 gramin banks.

=== Backward Regions Grant Fund ===
Uttar Dinajpur district is listed as a backward region and receives financial support from the Backward Regions Grant Fund. The fund, created by the Government of India, is designed to redress regional imbalances in development. As of 2012, 272 districts across the country were listed under this scheme. The list includes 11 districts of West Bengal.

== Transport ==
Raiganj CD Block has 7 ferry services, 45 originating/ terminating bus routes.

The Barsoi-Radhikapur branch line passes through the Raiganj CD Block and there are stations at Jhitka and Raiganj.

Assam Behar State Railway extended the metre gauge railway from Parbatipur, now in Bangladesh, to Katihar in 1889. With the partition of Bengal in 1947, the Indian side of the Barsoi-Parbatipur line became the Barsoi-Radhikapur branch line. It was converted to broad gauge in 2006.

New broad gauge lines – Gazole-Itahar (27.20 km), Itahar-Raiganj (22.16 km) and Itahar-Buniadpur (27.095 km) – as a material modification of the Eklakhi-Balurghat project (commissioned in 2004) was included in the budget 1983–84. Initial work for the lines has been taken up by Northeast Frontier Railway. 431.973 ha of land is to be acquired. Land acquisition has commenced in the Gazole-Itahar sector with initial fund sanctions. As of August 2018, further sanctions are awaited.

National Highway 12 (old number NH 34) passes through Raiganj and Raiganj CD Block.

State Highway No. 10A, running from Buniadpur to Raiganj originates/ terminates at Raiganj.

== Education ==
In 2012–13, Raiganj CD Block had 259 primary schools with 36,441 students, 30 middle schools with 3,026 students, 6 high schools with 2,733 students and 39 higher secondary schools with 44,561 students. Raiganj CD Block had 2 technical /professional institutions with 340 students and 745 institutions for special and non-formal education with 35,579 students. There are 2 degree colleges with 9,957 students and other educational facilities at Raiganj, outside the CD Block.

As per the 2011 census, in Raiganj CD Block, amongst the 221 inhabited villages, 10 villages did not have a school, 154 villages had 1 or more primary schools, 57 villages had at least 1 primary and 1 middle school and 28 villages had at least 1 middle and 1 secondary school.

The mid-day meal programme for rural school children was launched in 2005 in Uttar Dinajpur district. As on 30 April 2015, 602,557 children in 3,006 schools were covered under this programme. Maharaja Hat High School

== Healthcare ==
In 2013, Raiganj CD Block had 1 block primary health centre and 3 primary health centres, with total 28 beds and 4 doctors (excluding private bodies). It had 57 family welfare subcentres. 2,255 patients were treated indoor and 280,769 patients were treated outdoor in the hospitals, health centres and subcentres of the CD Block. Raiganj has 3 hospitals and 6 private nursing homes with total 562 beds and 46 doctors, all located outside the CD Block but accessible by people of the neighbouring areas.

Raiganj block primary health centre at Maharaja Hat (with 10 beds) is the main medical facility in Raiganj CD block. There are primary health centres at PO Bhupalpur (Durgapur PHC) (with 6 beds), PO Bhupalpur (Bindol PHC) (with 6 beds), PO Bhatolhat (Bhatun PHC) (with 10 beds). Raiganj District Hospital, now a part of Raiganj Medical College, with 300 beds, at Raiganj, is located outside Raiganj CD block.
