= Kaliaganj (community development block) =

- Community development block
- Interactive map of Kaliaganj
- Coordinates: 25.63°N 88.32°E
- Country: India
- State: West Bengal
- District: Uttar Dinajpur

Government
  - Type: Community development block

Area
  - Total: 301.90 km^{2} (116.56 sq mi)

Population (2011)
  - Total: 224,142
  - Density: 742.44/km^{2} (1,922.9/sq mi)

Languages
  - Official: Bengali, English
- Time zone: UTC+5:30 (IST)
- Lok Sabha constituency: Raiganj
- Vidhan Sabha constituency: Kaliaganj
- Website: uttardinajpur.nic.in

Kaliaganj is a community development block that forms an administrative division in Raiganj subdivision of Uttar Dinajpur district in the Indian state of West Bengal.

== History ==
Historically the western frontier of ancient Pundravardhana kingdom, bordering ancient Anga of Mahabharat fame, the Dinajpur area remained somewhat obscure in the major empires that held sway over the region and beyond till the rise of the Dinajpur Raj during the Mughal period. Some areas later forming a part of Uttar Dinajpur were parts of kingdoms in Nepal. Dinajpur district was constituted by the British in 1786, with a portion of the estate of Dinajpur Raj. Subsequent to the Permanent Settlement in 1793, the semi-independent Dinajpur Raj was further broken down and some of its tracts were transferred to the neighbouring British districts of Purnea, Malda, Rajshahi and Bogra. In 1947, the Radcliffe Line placed the Sadar and Thakurgaon subdivisions of Dinajpur district in East Pakistan. The Balurghat subdivision of Dinajpur district was reconstituted as West Dinajpur district in West Bengal. Raiganj subdivision was formed in 1948.

In order to restore territorial links between northern and southern parts of West Bengal which had been snapped during the partition of Bengal, and on the recommendations of the States Reorganisation Commission a portion of the erstwhile Kishanganj subdivision comprising Goalpokhar, Islampur and Chopra thanas (police stations) and parts of Thakurganj thana, along with the adjacent parts of the erstwhile Gopalpur thana in Katihar subdivision were transferred from Purnea district in Bihar to West Bengal in 1956, and were formally incorporated into Raiganj subdivision in West Dinajpur. The township of Kishanganj and its entire municipal boundary remained within Bihar. Islampur subdivision was formed in March 1959. At the same time, the portion of Chopra PS lying to the north of the Mahananda river covering an area that now comprises Bidhannagar-1 gram panchayat, Bidhannagar-2 GP, Chathat-Bansgaon GP and the southern half of Phansidewa-Bansgaon Kismat GP in Darjeeling district, was transferred from West Dinajpur to the jurisdiction of Phansidewa PS in Darjeling district. With the introduction of the Community Development Programme in 1960–61, community development blocks were set up in West Dinajpur district.

In 1992, West Dinajpur district was bifurcated and Uttar Dinajpur district was established.

== Geography ==
Kaliaganj is located at 25°38′N 88°19′E.

Uttar Dinajpur district has a flat topography and slopes gently from north to south. All rivers flow in that direction. Except for the eastern fringes of Chopra CD Block, most of the district is a part of the catchment area of the Mahanada and also a part of the larger Barind Tract. The soil is composed of different varieties of alluvium. The main rivers are: Nagar, Mahananda, Kulik, Gamari, Chhiramati (Srimati) and Tangon. The rivers have little water in the dry season but with heavy rains, during monsoon, overflow the banks. The Tangon river flows through the upper portion of western part of Kaliaganj CD Block. The Chhiramati river touches the south-eastern edge of the CD Block and the Gamari river touches the south-western edge of Kaliaganj CD Block.

Approximately 206 km of the India-Bangladesh border is in Uttar Dinajpur district. It covers the eastern boundary of the district. On the western side Uttar Dinajpur district has 227 km boundary with Bihar.

Kaliaganj CD Block is bounded by Pirganj Upazila in Thakurgaon District and Bochaganj Upazila in Dinajpur district, both in Bangladesh, on the north, Biral Upazila in Dinajpur District of Bangladesh on the east, Kushmandi CD Block, in Dakshin Dinajpur, and Itahar CD Block on the south and Raiganj and Hemtabad CD Blocks on the west.

Kaliaganj CD Block has an area of 301.90 km^{2}. It has 1 panchayat samiti, 8 gram panchayats, 148 gram sansads (village councils), 192 mouzas and 191 inhabited villages. Kaliaganj police station serves this block. Headquarters of this CD Block is at Kaliaganj.

Uttar Dinajpur district is one of the smaller districts in the state and stands 15th in terms of area (3,140.00 km^{2}) in the state.

Gram panchayats of Kaliaganj block/ panchayat samiti are: Anantapur, Baruna, Bhandar, Bochadanga, Dhankoil, Malgaon, Mostafanagar and Radhikapur.

== Demographics ==
=== Population ===
As per the 2011 Census of India, Kaliaganj CD Block had a total population of 224,142, all of which were rural. There were 114,104 (51%) males and 109,038 (49%) females. Population below 6 years was 29,540. Scheduled Castes numbered 138,461 (61.77%) and Scheduled Tribes numbered 12,675 (5.65%).

As per 2001 census, Kaliaganj block had a total population of 190,014, out of which 97,822 were males and 92,192 were females. Kaliaganj block registered a population growth of 26.58 per cent during the 1991–2001 decade. Decadal growth for the district was 28.72 per cent.

Large villages (with 4,000+ population) in Kaliaganj CD Block were (2011 population in brackets): Delwarpur (5,086), Kunore (4,709) and Malgaon (6,048).

Other villages in Kaliaganj CD Block included (2011 population in brackets): Baruna (1,721), Bochadanga (1,406), Mustafanagar (3,865), Bhandar (3,078), Radhikapur (1,057) and Anantapur (1,976).

Decadal Population Growth Rate (%)

View source data.

Note: The CD Block data for 1971–1981, 1981–1991 and 1991–2001 is for Kaliaganj PS covering the block

The decadal growth of population in Kaliaganj CD Block in 2001–2011 was 17.96%. The decadal growth of population in Kaliaganj PS in 1991–2001 was 24.46%, in 1981–91 was 22.22% and in 1971–81 was 25.62%. The decadal growth rate of population in Uttar Dinajpur district was as follows: 30.2% in 1971–81, 34.0% in 1981–91, 28.7% in 1991–2001 and 23.2% in 2001–11. The decadal growth rate for West Bengal was 13.93% in 2001–2011, 17.77% in 1991–2001. 24.73% in 1981–1991 and 23.17% in 1971–1981.

Uttar Dinajpur district has the highest decadal population growth rate in West Bengal with a figure of 23.2% for the decade 2001–2011 and is much higher than the state average of 13.8%.

According to the Human Development Report for Uttar Dinajpur district, population growth in the area that later became Uttar Dinajpur district was low in the pre-independence era. Between 1911 and 1931, Kaliaganj PS with its railway town had been the most densely settled area in the district, but was surpassed by Itahar PS in 1941, and by both Raiganj PS and Itahar PS in 1951. Population growth started picking up with the waves of East Bengali refugees coming in from erstwhile East Pakistan.

The Human Development Report analyses, "A spurt in population growth rates first became evident between 1951–1961, and was further magnified between 1971–81 after the creation of Bangladesh when population growth in most districts bordering the Bangladesh-West Bengal frontier showed similar escalation. However, after 1981, when population growth in most other West Bengal districts had tapered off, growth rates in Uttar Dinajpur again showed a fresh spurt. Thus, no deceleration in population growth rates occurred in the district until after 1991… In addition to Hindu and tribal migrants from across the international border, a sizeable number of migrant Muslims have also settled in the district, mainly driven by economic reasons… migrants from other states comprised 23% of the total migrants residing in Uttar Dinajpur." The large number of migrants from other states is mainly from the neighbouring areas in Bihar.

A study by North Bengal University has observed that "Immigrants from East Pakistan/Bangladesh have arrived in Uttar Dinajpur almost equal numbers before and after 1971." The Human Development Report opines, "The overall post-Partition impact on the rates of demographic growth has been particularly strong in all North Bengal districts. Despite its smaller relative size, the region has received more migration in pro rata terms than the West Bengal districts lying south of the Ganga."

=== Literacy ===
As per the 2011 census, the total number of literates in Kaliaganj CD Block was 129,417 (66.50% of the population over 6 years) out of which males numbered 74,657 (74.58% of the male population over 6 years) and females numbered 54,760 (57.96% of the female population over 6 years). The gender disparity (the difference between female and male literacy rates) was 16.62%.

The literacy rate in Uttar Dinajpur district at 60.13% in 2011, up from 47.89% in 2001, was the lowest amongst all districts of West Bengal. The highest literacy rate amongst the districts of West Bengal was that of Purba Medinipur district at 87.66% in 2011.

See also – List of West Bengal districts ranked by literacy rate

Literacy in CD blocks of
Uttar Dinajpur district
Raiganj subdivision
Raiganj – 63.52%
Hemtabad – 67.88%
Kaliaganj – 66.50%
Itahar – 58.95%
Islampur subdivision
Chopra – 59.90%
Islampur – 53.53%
Goalpokhar I – 42.26%
Goalpokhar II – 46.07%
Karandighi – 53.42%
Source: 2011 Census: CD Block Wise
Primary Census Abstract Data

=== Language and religion ===
Religion in Kaliaganj CD Block (2011)
Hinduism	79.08%
Islam	20.55%
Other or not stated	0.37%

In the 2011 census, Hindus numbered 177,257 and formed 79.08% of the population in Kaliaganj CD Block. Muslims numbered 46,066 and formed 20.55% of the population. Christians numbered 646 and formed 0.29% of the population. Others numbered 173 and formed 0.08% of the population. In Kaliaganj CD Block, as per the District Statistical Handbook for Uttar Dinajpur, while the proportion of Muslims increased marginally from 20.47% in 1991 to 20.70% in 2001, the proportion of Hindus declined marginally from 79.34% in 1991 to 78.96% in 2001.

Languages of Kaliaganj CD block (2011)
1. Bengali (93.0%)
2. Santali (3.16%)
3. Sadri (0.93%)
4. Others (2.91%)

At the time of the 2011 census, 93.00% of the population spoke Bengali, 3.16% Santali and 0.93% Sadri as their first language.

== Rural poverty ==
As per the Rural Household Survey conducted in 2002, 35.4% of the rural families in Kaliaganj CD Block belonged to the BPL category, against 46.7% of rural families in Uttar Dinajpur district being in the BPL category. As per the Human Development Report for Uttar Dinajpur district, with the highest levels of human development in rural Uttar Dinajpur, Kaliaganj block also records the lowest Human Poverty Index (HPI). It is evident that the high attainments in terms of human development attributes are inclusive in nature, and have, therefore, been able to lower the concentration of poverty in the block. Kaliaganj and Raiganj form a pocket of low human poverty. Exclusion and human poverty is otherwise widely present in the other blocks of Uttar Dinajpur.

== Economy ==
=== Livelihood ===
Livelihood
in Kaliaganj CD Block
1. Cultivators (36.3%)
2. Agricultural labourers (44.7%)
3. Household industries (2.31%)
4. Other Workers (16.6%)

In Kaliaganj CD Block in 2011, amongst the class of total workers, cultivators numbered 34,348 and formed 36.33%, agricultural labourers numbered 42,271 and formed 44.72%, household industry workers numbered 2,185 and formed 2.31% and other workers numbered 15,730 and formed 16.64%. Total workers numbered 94,534 and formed 42.18% of the total population, and non-workers numbered 129,608 and formed 57.82% of the population.

Note: In the census records a person is considered a cultivator, if the person is engaged in cultivation/ supervision of land owned by self/government/institution. When a person who works on another person's land for wages in cash or kind or share, is regarded as an agricultural labourer. Household industry is defined as an industry conducted by one or more members of the family within the household or village, and one that does not qualify for registration as a factory under the Factories Act. Other workers are persons engaged in some economic activity other than cultivators, agricultural labourers and household workers. It includes factory, mining, plantation, transport and office workers, those engaged in business and commerce, teachers, entertainment artistes and so on.

=== Infrastructure ===
There are 191 inhabited villages in Kaliaganj CD Block. All 191 villages (100%) have power supply. All 191 villages (100%) have drinking water supply. 20 villages (10.47%) have post offices. 187 villages (97.91%) have telephones (including landlines, public call offices and mobile phones). 75 villages (39.27%) have a pucca (paved) approach road and 23 villages (12.04%) have transport communication (includes bus service, rail facility and navigable waterways). 6 villages (3.14%) have agricultural credit societies. 13 villages (6.81%) have banks.

=== Agriculture ===
"With its distinctive physiographic and agroclimatic features, the Dinajpur region has been a bread-basket area of Bengal for many centuries, growing multiple varieties of fine and coarse rice in vast quantities, along with major economic crops like jute. The livelihood profile of Uttar Dinajpur district has evolved in association with these old agricultural patterns, and more than two-thirds of its active workforce still draws livelihoods directly from agriculture and related occupations."

Agricultural potential has been uneven across Uttar Dinajpur based on soil conditions and irrigation potential. This has generated considerable internal migration within the district, as areas with higher agricultural potential and higher labour demand has attracted large number of people. The impact of land reforms has also varied. As the Islampur subdivision blocks evolved initially under the Bihar administration, the land estates were larger in size and the extent of land acquired under ceiling laws were higher. The cultivator population in Islampur subdivision was also thinner. Such conditions have been favourable for migrants. The movement of people from agricultural activities to non-agricultural activities has been low in Uttar Dinajpur district except for some pockets.

Kaliaganj CD Block had 215 fertiliser depots, 37 seed stores and 40 fair price shops in 2013–14.

In 2013–14, Kaliaganj CD Block produced 47,525 tonnes of Aman paddy, the main winter crop from 18,885 hectares, 24,614 tonnes of Boro paddy (spring crop) from 8,393 hectares, 6,277 tonnes of wheat from 2,769 hectares, 34 tonnes of maize from 14 hectares, 60,475 tonnes of jute from 3,963 hectares, and 35,552 tonnes of potatoes from 1,442 hectares. It also produced pulses and oilseeds.

In 2013–14, the total area irrigated in Kaliaganj CD Block was 1,232 hectares, out of which 327 hectares were irrigated by river lift irrigation and 905 hectares by deep tube wells.

=== Craft based activities ===
"More than eleven hundred rural households across the district are engaged in traditional crafts based industries, among which dhokra, mat making, terracotta, village pottery and bamboo craft in the Goalpokhar-1 and Kaliaganj regions are notable."

=== Banking ===
In 2012–13, Kaliaganj CD Block had offices of 6 commercial banks and 2 gramin banks.

=== Backward Regions Grant Fund ===
Uttar Dinajpur district is listed as a backward region and receives financial support from the Backward Regions Grant Fund. The fund, created by the Government of India, is designed to redress regional imbalances in development. As of 2012, 272 districts across the country were listed under this scheme. The list includes 11 districts of West Bengal.

== Transport ==
Kaliaganj CD Block has 7 originating/ terminating bus routes.

The Barsoi-Radhikapur branch line passes through the Kaliaganj CD Block and there are stations at Kaliaganj and Radhikapur.

Assam Behar State Railway extended the metre gauge railway from Parbatipur, now in Bangladesh, to Katihar in 1889. With the partition of Bengal in 1947, the Indian side of the Barsoi-Parbatipur line became the Barsoi-Radhikapur branch line. It was converted to broad gauge in 2006.

New broad gauge line from Kaliaganj to Buniadpur (33.10 km) was included in the budget 2010–11. 157.938 ha of land is to be acquired. As of August 2018, project work by Northeast Frontier Railway held up mainly because of paucity of funds.

State Highway No. 10A, running from Buniadpur to Raiganj passes through Kaliaganj town and Kaliaganj CD Block.

== Education ==
In 2012–13, Kaliaganj CD Block had 163 primary schools with 19,004 students, 12 middle schools with 1,622 students, 2 high schools with 1,752 students and 28 higher secondary schools with 25,974 students. Kaliaganj CD Block had 1 technical /professional institutions with 50 students and 463 institutions for special and non-formal education with 21,594 students.

As per the 2011 census, in Kaliaganj CD Block, amongst the 191 inhabited villages, 30 villages did not have a school, 128 villages had 1 or more primary schools, 32 villages had at least 1 primary and 1 middle school and 19 villages had at least 1 middle and 1 secondary school.

The mid-day meal programme for rural school children was launched in 2005 in Uttar Dinajpur district. As on 30 April 2015, 602,557 children in 3,006 schools were covered under this programme.

Kaliyaganj College was established in 1968 at Kaliaganj (outside the CD block).

Netaji Subhas Ch. Bose Teachers Training College was established at Village: Ratanpur, PO Bindole, PS Raiganj.

== Healthcare ==
In 2013, Kaliaganj CD Block had 2 primary health centres, with total 16 beds. It had 31 family welfare subcentres. Kaliaganj has a hospital with 70 beds, located outside the block but accessible to them. Kaliaganj town and block together had 7 doctors (except private bodies). 9,196 patients were treated indoor and 233,520 patients were treated outdoor in the hospitals, health centres and subcentres of the town and CD Block.

Kunour block primary health centre at Kunour (with 10 beds) is the main medical facility in Kaliaganj CD block. There is a primary health centre at Majhiar (with 6 beds. Kaliaganj State General Hospital, with 60 beds at Kaliaganj, is located outside Kaliaganj CD block.
