= Bidyut Chakrabarty =

Indian political scientist

Bidyut Chakrabarty is an Indian professor and political analyst who served as the Vice-Chancellor of Visva Bharati University (2018-2023). He was Professor in the Department of Political Science in University of Delhi till November 2018.

== Education ==
He completed his PhD from London School of Economics.
