= Raiganj subdivision =

- Subdivision
- Interactive map of Raiganj subdivision
- Coordinates: 25.62°N 88.12°E
- Country: India
- State: West Bengal
- District: North Dinajpur
- Headquarters: Raiganj

Languages
  - Official: Bengali, English
- Time zone: UTC+5:30 (IST)
- ISO 3166 code: ISO 3166-2:IN
- Vehicle registration: WB
- Website: wb.gov.in

Raiganj subdivision is an administrative subdivision of the Uttar Dinajpur district in the Indian state of West Bengal.

== Subdivisions ==
Uttar Dinajpur district is divided into two administrative subdivisions:

Subdivision	Headquarters	Area km^{2} (2001)	Population (2011)	Urban population % (2011)	Rural Population % (2011)
Raiganj	Raiganj	1,350.56	1,337,229	19.39	80.61
Islampur	Islampur	1,768.57	1,669,895	6.17	93.83
Uttar Dinajpur district	Raiganj	3,140.00	3,007,134	12.05	87.95

== Administrative units ==
Raiganj subdivision has 4 police stations, 4 community development blocks, 4 panchayat samitis, 39 gram panchayats, 747 mouzas, 745 inhabited villages, 2 municipalities and 3 census towns. The municipalities are at Raiganj and Kaliaganj. The census towns are: Nachhratpur Katabari, Kasba and Itahar. The subdivision has its headquarters at Raiganj.

== Police stations ==
Police stations in Raiganj subdivision have the following features and jurisdiction:

Police station	Area covered (km^{2})	Border (km)	Population	Municipal town/ city	CD Block
Raiganj	472.13	n/a	427,820	Raiganj	Raiganj
Raiganj Women	-	-	-	Raiganj	-
Hemtabad	191.6	n/a	142,022	-	Hemtabad
Kaliaganj	301.9	n/a	224,382	Kaliaganj	Kaliaganj
Itahar	364.17	-	249,500	-	Itahar

== Blocks ==
Community development blocks in Raiganj subdivision are:

CD Block	Headquarters	Area km^{2}	Population (2011)	SC %	ST %	Hindus %	Muslims %	Literacy rate %	Census Towns
Raiganj	Raiganj	472.13	430,221	38.04	6.46	65.13	34.14	63.52	2
Hemtabad	Hemtabad	191.82	142,056	34.81	4.57	49.25	50.14	67.88	-
Kaliaganj	Kaliaganj	301.90	224,142	61.77	5.65	79.08	20.55	66.50	-
Itahar	Itahar	362.40	303,678	25.74	8.28	47.43	51.98	58.95	1

== Gram panchayats ==
The subdivision contains 39 gram panchayats under 4 community development blocks:

- Hemtabad block: Rural area consists of five gram panchayats, viz. Bangalbari, Chainagar, Naoda, Bishnupur and Hemtabad.
- Itahar block: Rural area consists of 12 gram panchayats, viz. Chhayghara, Gulandar–I, Joyhat, Patirajpur, Durgapur, Gulandar–II, Kapasia, Surun–I, Durlovpur, Itahar, Marnai and Surun–II.
- Kaliaganj block: Rural area consists of eight gram panchayats, viz. Anantapur, Bhandar, Dhankoil, Mustafanagar, Baruna, Bochadanga, Malgaon and Radhikapur.
- Raiganj block: Rural area consists of 14 gram panchayats, viz. Bahin, Gouri, Mahipur, Sitgram, Barua, Jagadishpur, Maraikura, Bhatun, Bindole, Kamalabari–I, Rampur Maharajahat, Birghoi, Kamalabari–II and Serpur.

== Education ==
Uttar Dinajpur district had a literacy rate of 59.07% (for population of 7 years and above) as per the census of India 2011. Raiganj subdivision had a literacy rate of 66.94%, Islampur subdivision 52.40%.

The table below offers a comprehensive picture of the education scenario in Uttar Dinajpur district for the year 2012-13:

Subdivision	Primary School		Middle School		High School		Higher Secondary School		General College, Univ		Technical / Professional Instt		Non-formal Education	
Subdivision	Institution	Student	Institution	Student	Institution	Student	Institution	Student	Institution	Student	Institution	Student	Institution	Student
Raiganj	810	104,842	83	7,836	18	9,525	140	146,367	4	18,334	6	973	2,218	111,064
Islampur	760	171,598	72	14,226	27	22,437	86	121,719	2	9,683	1	47	2,648	221,977
Uttar Dinajpur district	1,570	276,440	155	22,062	45	31,962	226	268,086	6	28,017	7	1,020	4,866	333,041

Note: Primary schools include junior basic schools; middle schools, high schools and higher secondary schools include madrasahs; technical schools include junior technical schools, junior government polytechnics, industrial technical institutes, industrial training centres, nursing training institutes etc.; technical and professional colleges include engineering colleges, medical colleges, para-medical institutes, management colleges, teachers training and nursing training colleges, law colleges, art colleges, music colleges etc. Special and non-formal education centres include sishu siksha kendras, madhyamik siksha kendras, centres of Rabindra mukta vidyalaya, recognised Sanskrit tols, institutions for the blind and other handicapped persons, Anganwadi centres, reformatory schools etc.

The following institutions are located in Raiganj subdivision:

- Raiganj University came into being in 2015, with the upgradation of Raiganj College (University College), which was initially set up in 1948 as Raiganj College.
- Raiganj Government Medical College and Hospital was established in 2018, incorporating the District Hospital.
- Raiganj Surendranath Mahavidyalaya was established in 1986.
- Kaliyaganj College was established in 1968 at Kaliaganj.
- Dr. Meghnad Saha College was established in 2000 at Village: Ranipur, PO Tilna, PS Itahar.
- Raiganj Polytechnic was established in 1986.
- Raiganj B.ED. College was established in 1981.
- Netaji Subhas Ch. Bose Teachers Training College was established at Village: Ratanpur, PO Bindole, PS Raiganj.
- Moulana Abul Kalam Azad B.Ed. College was established in 2005 at Village: Bagbari, PO Itahar.

== Healthcare ==
The table below (all data in numbers) presents an overview of the medical facilities available and patients treated in the hospitals, health centres and sub-centres in 2013 in Uttar Dinajpur district.

Subdivision	Health & Family Welfare Deptt, WB				Other State Govt Deptts	Local bodies	Central Govt Deptts / PSUs	NGO / Private Nursing Homes	Total	Total Number of Beds	Total Number of Doctors*	Indoor Patients	Outdoor Patients
Subdivision	Hospitals	Rural Hospitals	Block Primary Health Centres	Primary Health Centres	Other State Govt Deptts	Local bodies	Central Govt Deptts / PSUs	NGO / Private Nursing Homes	Total	Total Number of Beds	Total Number of Doctors*	Indoor Patients	Outdoor Patients
Raiganj	2	-	3	10	1	1	-	6	23	774	67	61,438	1,274,032
Islampur	1	1	4	9	-	-	-	7	22	455	59	50,520	1,500,160
Uttar Dinajpur district	3	1	7	19	1	1	-	13	45	1,229	126	112,058	2,774,192

.* Excluding nursing homes

Medical facilities available in Raiganj subdivision are as follows:

Hospitals: (Name, location, beds)
Raiganj District Hospital, Raiganj, 300 beds
Kasba Police Hospital, PO Debipur, Raiganj, 50 beds
Kaliaganj State General Hospital, Kaliaganj, 60 beds
Rural Hospitals: (Name, CD block, location, beds)
Itahar Rural Hospital, Itahar CD block, Itahar, 30 beds
Hemtabad Rural Hospital, Hemtabad CD block, Uttar Dinajpur, 30 beds
Block Primary Health Centre: (Name, block, location, beds)
Rampur BPHC, Raiganj CD block, Rampur, 10 beds
Kunour BPHC, Kaliaganj CD block, Kunour, 10 beds
Primary Health Centres: (CD Block-wise)(CD block, PHC location, beds)
Raiganj CD block: PO Bhupalpur (Durgapur PHC) (6), PO Bhupalpur (Bindol PHC) (6), PO Bholahat (Bhatun PHC) (10)
Itahar CD block: Marani (10), Churaman (6), Paraharipur (Surun PHC) (6)
Kaliaganj CD block: Majhiar (6)
Hemtabad CD block: Bangalbari (10), Baharail (6)

== Electoral constituencies ==
Lok Sabha (parliamentary) and Vidhan Sabha (state assembly) constituencies in Raiganj subdivision were as follows:

Lok Sabha constituency	Reservation	Vidhan Sabha constituency	Reservation	CD Block and/or Gram panchayats and/or municipal areas
Raiganj	None	Raiganj	None	Raiganj municipality, and Bahin, Maraikup, Gouri, Kamalabati I and Kamalabati II GPs of Raiganj CD block
		Kaliaganj	Reserved for SC	Kaliaganj municipality, Kaliaganj CD block and Barua and Birghai GPs of Raiganj CD Block
		Hemtabad	Reserved for SC	Hemtabad CD block and Bhatol, Bindol, Jagadishpur, Mahipur, Sherpur, Rampur and Sitgram GPs of Raiganj CD block
		Other assembly segments outside the subdivision		
Balurghat	None	Itahar	None	Itahar CD block
		Other assembly segments outside the subdivision		
