= List of cities in West Bengal by population =

This is a list of urban agglomerations and cities (those not included in the urban agglomerations), with a population above 100,000 as per the 2011 census in the Indian state of West Bengal.

== List ==
| Rank | Name | District | Type* | Population 2011 | Male | Female | Population below 5 yrs | Literacy rate |
|---|---|---|---|---|---|---|---|---|
| 1 | Kolkata | Kolkata, North 24 Parganas; South 24 Parganas, Nadia, Howrah, Hooghly, | UA (Tier 1) | 14,112,536 | 7,319,682 | 6,792,854 | 1,063,394 | 88.33 |
| 2 | Asansol | Paschim Bardhaman | UA(Tier 2) | 1,243,008 | 647,831 | 595,177 | 132,560 | 80.00 |
| 3 | Siliguri | Darjeeling, Jalpaiguri | UA (Tier 2) | 701,489 | 359,750 | 341,739 | 72,252 | 82.05 |
| 4 | Durgapur | Paschim Bardhaman | UA (Tier 2) | 581,409 | 301,700 | 279,709 | 51,930 | 87.70 |
| 5 | Bardhaman | Purba Bardhaman | UA(Tier 2) | 347,016 | 177,055 | 169,961 | 25,069 | 88.62 |
| 6 | Malda | Malda | UA | 324,237 | 175,073 | 149,164 | 44,186 | 81.32 |
| 7 | Baharampur | Murshidabad | UA | 305,609 | 156,489 | 149,120 | 23,182 | 88.38 |
| 8 | Habra | North 24 Parganas | UA | 304,584 | 154,861 | 149,723 | 23,023 | 91.03 |
| 9 | Kharagpur | Paschim Medinipur | UA | 293,719 | 150,487 | 143,232 | 25,130 | 85.61 |
| 10 | Shantipur | Nadia | UA | 288,718 | 147,299 | 141,419 | 24,006 | 82.67 |
| 11 | Dankuni | Hooghly | UA | 249,840 | 128,139 | 121,701 | 22,956 | 85.69 |
| 12 | Dhulian | Murshidabad | UA | 239,022 | 119,151 | 119,871 | 45,483 | 60.06 |
| 13 | Ranaghat | Nadia | UA | 235,583 | 119,578 | 116,005 | 18,575 | 86.10 |
| 14 | Haldia | Purba Medinipur | City (Tier 2) | 200,762 | 104,852 | 95,910 | 21,122 | 89.06 |
| 15 | Raiganj | Uttar Dinajpur | UA | 199,758 | 104,966 | 94,792 | 22,028 | 81.71 |
| 16 | Krishnanagar | Nadia | UA | 181,182 | 91,583 | 89,599 | 13,663 | 88.09 |
| 17 | Nabadwip | Nadia | UA | 175,474 | 90,810 | 84,664 | 13,049 | 84.57 |
| 18 | Medinipur | Paschim Medinipur | UA | 169,127 | 85,362 | 83,765 | 14,365 | 90.01 |
| 19 | Jalpaiguri | Jalpaiguri | UA | 169,013 | 85,226 | 83,787 | 14,522 | 86.03 |
| 20 | Balurghat | Dakshin Dinajpur | UA | 164,593 | 82,466 | 82,127 | 10,349 | 91.66 |
| 21 | Basirhat | North 24 Parganas | UA | 144,891 | 73,491 | 71,400 | 12,578 | 86.88 |
| 22 | Bankura | Bankura | City | 138,036 | 70,734 | 67,302 | 10,760 | 87.27 |
| 23 | Chakdaha | Nadia | UA | 132,855 | 67,135 | 65,720 | 9,829 | 90.95 |
| 24 | Darjeeling | Darjeeling | UA | 132,016 | 65,839 | 66,177 | 7,382 | 93.17 |
| 25 | Alipurduar | Alipurduar | UA | 127,342 | 64,898 | 62,444 | 10,545 | 89.16 |
| 26 | Purulia | Purulia | UA | 126,894 | 65,334 | 61,560 | 12,116 | 81.53 |
| 27 | Jangipur | Murshidabad | UA | 122,875 | 62,734 | 60,141 | 16,299 | 75.71 |
| 28 | Bolpur | Birbhum | City | 112,591 | 56,755 | 55,836 | 9,592 | 86.77 |
| 29 | Bangaon | North 24 Parganas | City | 110,668 | 56,416 | 54,252 | 8,452 | 90.25 |
| 30 | Cooch Behar | Cooch Behar | UA | 106,760 | 5398883 | 52,957 | 7,910 | 91.75 |
* UA=Urban Agglomeration

== Urban agglomerations ==
In the census of India 2011, an urban agglomeration has been defined as follows:

"An urban agglomeration is a continuous urban spread constituting a town and its adjoining outgrowths (OGs), or two or more physically contiguous towns together with or without outgrowths of such towns. An Urban Agglomeration must consist of at least a statutory town and its total population (i.e. all the constituents put together) should not be less than 20,000 as per the 2001 Census. In varying local conditions, there were similar other combinations which have been treated as urban agglomerations satisfying the basic condition of contiguity."

=== Urban agglomeration constituents ===
Urban agglomerations constituents with a population above 100,000 as per the 2011 census are shown in the table below.

The constituents of urban agglomerations in West Bengal, with a population of 1 lakh or above, are noted below:

- Kolkata Urban Agglomeration includes : Kolkata district: Kolkata (M Corp.), Nadia district: Kalyani (M), Gayespur (M), North 24 Parganas district: Raigachhi (CT), Barasat (M), Madhyamgram (M), Kanchrapara (M), Nanna (OG), Chakla (OG), Srotribati (OG), Jetia (CT), Halisahar (M), Balibhara (CT), Naihati (M), Noapara (P) (CT), Babanpur (CT), Teghari (CT), Bhatpara (M), Panpur (OG), Kaugachhi (CT), Garshyamnagar (CT), Garulia (M), Ichhapur Defence Estate (CT), North Barrackpur (M), Barrackpur Cantonment (CB), Barrackpur (M), Jafarpur (CT), Ruiya (CT), Titagarh (M), Khardaha (M), Bandipur (CT), Panihati (M), Muragachha (CT), New Barrackpur (M), Chandpur (CT), Talbandha (CT), Patulia (CT), Kamarhati (M), Baranagar (M), South Dum Dum (M), North Dum Dum (M), Dum Dum (M), Rajarhat-Gopalpur (M) [now merged with Bidhannagar (M Corp.)], Bidhannagar (M Corp.), Nabadiganta Industrial Township Authority (Salt Lake Sector V) (M), West Bengal Housing Infrastructure Development Corp (New Town) (M), Hooghly district: Dankuni (M Corp) Bansberia (M), Hugli-Chinsurah (M), Bara Khejuria (OG), Shankhanagar (CT), Amodghata (CT), Chak Banshberia (CT), Naldanga (CT), Kodalia (CT), Kulihanda (CT), Simla (CT), Dharmapur (CT), Bhadreswar (M), Champdani (M), Chandannagar (M Corp.), Baidyabati (M), Serampore (M), Rishra (M), Rishra (CT), Bamunari (CT), Dakshin Rajyadharpur (CT), Nabagram Colony (CT), Konnagar (M), Uttarpara Kotrung (M), Raghunathpur (PS-Dankuni) (CT), Kanaipur (CT), Keota (CT), Howrah district: Bally (M) [Now merged with Howrah (M Corp.)], Howrah (M Corp.), Bally (CT), Jagadishpur (CT), Chamrail (CT), Eksara (CT), Chakapara (CT), Khalia (CT), Bankra (CT), Nibra (CT), Mahiari (CT), Bipra Noapara (CT), Ankurhati (CT), Kantlia (CT), Salap (CT), Tentulkuli (CT), 83 Argari (CT), Andul (CT), Ramchandrapur (CT), Jhorhat (CT), Hatgachha (CT), Dhuilya (CT), Panchpara (CT), Podara (CT), Banupur (CT), Sankrail (CT), Manikpur (CT), Sarenga (CT), Raghudebbati (CT), Nalpur (CT), Uluberia (M), Chak Srikrishna (OG), Khalisani (CT), Uttar Pirpur (CT), Balarampota (CT), Santoshpur (CT), Domjur (CT), Dakshin Jhapardaha (CT), Makardaha (CT), Khantora (CT), Bhandardaha (CT), Kamranga (CT), Jaypur Bil (CT), South 24 Parganas district: Joka (CT), Chata Kalikapur (CT), Ganye Gangadharpur (CT), Rameswarpur (CT), Asuti (CT), Hanspukuria (CT), Kalua (CT), Ramchandrapur (CT), Samali (CT), Maheshtala (M), Uttar Raypur (CT), Balarampur (CT), Buita (CT), Benjanhari Acharial (CT), Abhirampur (CT), Nischintapur (CT), Birlapur (CT), Chak Kashipur (CT), Chak Alampur (CT), Bowali (CT), Dakshin Raypur (CT), Poali (CT), Pujali (M), Budge Budge (M), Daulatpur (CT), Bhasa (CT), Bishnupur (CT), Kanyanagar (CT), Nahazari (CT), Nadabhanga (CT), Kanganbaria (CT), Bora Gagangohalia (CT), Chanddandaha (CT), Barkalikapur (CT), Patharberia (CT), Ramkrishnapur (CT), Amtala (CT), Kriparampur (CT), Chak Enayetnagar (CT), Maricha (CT), Bhangar Raghunathpur (CT), Gobindapur (CT), Radhanagar (CT), Danga (CT), Ramchandrapur (CT), Bidyadharpur (CT), Kalikapur (CT), Chak Baria (CT), Sahebpur (CT), Rajpur Sonarpur (M), Petua (CT), Garia (CT), Panchghara (CT), Mallikpur (CT), Hariharpur (CT), Champahati (CT), Solgohalia (CT), Naridana (CT), Kalaria (CT), Gaur Daha (CT), Banshra (CT), Salipur (CT), Khodar Bazar (CT), Komarhat (CT), Baruipur (M), Raynagar (CT), Kalikapur Barasat (CT), Baharu (CT), Uttarparanij (CT), Alipur (CT), Uttar Durgapur (CT), Jaynagar Majilpur (M).
- Asansol Urban Agglomeration includes: Asansol (M Corp.), Salanpur-Rupnarayanpur (CT), Bhanowara (CT), Charanpur (OG), Jemari (J.K. Nagar Township) (CT), Sahebganj (CT), Egara (CT), Amkula (CT), Murgathaul (CT), Raghunathchak (CT), Ballavpur (CT), Majiara (CT), Domohani (CT), Topsi (CT), Baktarnagar (CT).
- Siliguri Jalpaiguri Urban Agglomeration includes: Darjeeling district: Siliguri (M Corp.), Kalkut/Champasari (CT), Shibmandir (CT), Bagdogra (CT), Jalpaiguri district: Dabgram (CT), Jalpaiguri (M)
- Durgapur Urban Agglomeration includes: Durgapur (M Corp.), Bamunara (CT), Arra (CT).
- Bardhaman Urban Agglomeration includes: Bardhaman (M), Goda (CT), Bahir Sarbamangala (CT), Gangpur (CT), Nari (CT), Mirzapur (CT), Talit (R), Kamnara(R).
- Haldia Tamluk Urban Agglomeration includes: Haldia (M), Tamluk (M), Mahishadal (CT), Nandigram (CT), Chandipur (CT), Nandakumar (CT), Panskura (M), Moyna (CT), Kolaghat (CT), Shantipur (CT), Anantpur (CT), Dakshin Baguan (CT), Amalhara (CT), Erashal (CT), Kotbar (CT), Kakdihi (CT), Kharisha (CT), Ashadtalya (CT), Barda (CT), Garh Kamalpur (CT), Kukrahati(CT), Mechogram (CT).
- Malda Urban Agglomeration includes: English Bazar (M), Old Malda (M), Chhatianmor (CT), Bagbari (CT), Sahapur (CT).
- Baharampur Urban Agglomeration includes: Baharampur (M), Kasimbazar (CT), Goaljan (CT), Gora Bazar (CT), Gopjan (CT), Sibdanga Badarpur (CT), Chaltia (CT), Haridasmati (CT), Ajodhya Nagar (CT), Banjetia (CT).
- Habra Urban Agglomeration includes: Habra (M), Ashoknagar Kalyangarh (M), Bara Bamonia (CT), Guma (CT), Anarbaria (CT), Khorddabamonia (CT).
- Kharagpur Urban Agglomeration includes: Kharagpur (M), Kharagpur Rly. Settlement (CT), Kalaikunda (CT).
- Santipur Urban Agglomeration includes: Santipur (M), Taherpur (NA), Taherpur (OG), Barasat (OG), Bhaduri (OG), Mahishdanga (OG), Phulia (CT), Patuli (CT), Badkulla (CT), Ghoralia (CT), Beharia (CT), Gangi (CT).
- Dankuni Urban Agglomeration includes: Dankuni (M), Purbba Tajpur (CT), Kharsarai (CT), Begampur (CT), Chikrand (CT), Pairagachha (CT), Barijhati (CT), Garalgachha (CT), Krishnapur (CT), Baruipara (CT), Borai (CT), Nawapara (CT), Basai (CT), Gangadharpur (CT), Manirampur, Janai (CT), Kapashanria (CT), Jaykrishnapur (CT), Tisa (CT), Baksa (CT), Panchghara (CT), Naiti (CT).
- Dhulian Urban Agglomeration includes: Dhulian (M), Anup Nagar (CT), Dhusaripara (CT), Uttar Mahammadpur (CT), Kankuria (CT), Chachanda (CT), Basudebpur (CT), Kohetpur (CT), Jaykrishnapur (CT), Jafrabad (CT).
- Ranaghat Urban Agglomeration includes: Ranaghat (M), Birnagar (M), Cooper's Camp (NA), Magurkhali (OG), Ranaghat (CT), Hijuli (CT), Aistala (CT), Satigachha (CT), Nasra (CT), Panpara (CT), Raghabpur (CT), Kamgachhi (CT), Anulia (CT), Halalpur Krishnapur (CT).
- Raiganj Urban Agglomeration includes: Raiganj (M), Maharaja Hat Kasba (CT), Nachhratpur Katabari (CT).
- Krishnanagar Urban Agglomeration includes: Krishnanagar (M), Baruihuda (CT), Paschim Bhatjangla (CT), Sonda (CT).
- Nabadwip Urban Agglomeration includes: Nabadwip (M), Char Maijdia (CT), Char Brahmanagar (CT), Bablari Dewanganj (CT), Tiorkhali (CT), Gadigachha (CT), Majdia (CT).
- Jalpaiguri Urban Agglomeration includes: Jalpaiguri (M), Mainaguri (M), Domohani (CT), Belakoba (CT), Paharpur (CT), Kranti (CT), Raninagar (CT), Mohitnagar (CT), Kharia (CT), Aurobindo (OG).
- Balurghat Urban Agglomeration includes: Balurghat (M), Baidyanathpara (OG), Chak Bhrigu (CT), Dakra (CT).
- Basirhat Urban Agglomeration includes: Basirhat (M), Uttar Bagundi (CT), Dandirhat (CT), Raghunathpur (CT).
- Chakdaha Urban Agglomeration includes: Chakdaha (M), Parbbatipur (CT), Gopalpur (CT), Belgharia (CT), Punglia (CT), Lalpur (CT).
- Darjeeling Urban Agglomeration includes: Darjeeling (M), Chongtong Tea Garden (CT), Singtam Tea Garden (CT).
- Alipurduar Urban Agglomeration includes: Alipurduar (M), Sobhaganj. (CT), Alipurduar Rly.Jnc. (CT), Chechakhata (CT), Paschim Jitpur (CT), Bholar Dabri (CT), Birpara (CT).
- Purulia Urban Agglomeration includes: Purulia (M), Raghabpur (CT).
- Jangipur Urban Agglomeration includes: Jangipur (M), Charka (CT), Dafarpur (CT), Ramnagar (CT).
- Cooch Behar Urban Agglomeration includes: Cooch Behar (M), Kharimala Khagrabari (CT), Guriahati (CT).

Abbreviations: M Corp. = Municipal Corporation, M = Municipality, CT = Census Town, OG = Out Growth, NA = Notified Area, CB = Cantonment Board
