= Satyajit Barman =

Indian politician from West Bengal

Minister of State For School Education, Government of West Bengal
- Minister: Bratya Basu
- Governor: C. V. Ananda Bose
- Chief Minister: Mamata Banerjee
- Department: School and Higher Education
- Incumbent
- Assumed office 2 August 2022
- Preceded by: Paresh Chandra Adhikary

Member of the West Bengal Legislative Assembly
- In office 10 May 2021 – 2026
- Preceded by: Debendra Nath Roy
- Constituency: Hemtabad

Personal details
- Party: Trinamool Congress

Satyajit Barman is an Indian politician from Trinamool Congress. In May 2021, he was elected as a member of the West Bengal Legislative Assembly from Hemtabad, Uttar Dinajpur, West Bengal, India. He has been appointed "Minister of State" for the School Education Department under Government of West Bengal after the suspension of MLA Paresh Chandra Adhikary on 17 May 2022.

== Political Journey ==
Satyajit was the student council leader at Surendranath College in Raiganj. After that, in 2013, he contested the panchayat election for the first time on a Congress ticket. Satyajit lost that vote. After that, he joined Trinamool in 2014. After winning the Panchayat Samiti elections, 2018, Satyajit became the Acting Chairman of Raiganj Panchayat Samiti. Satyajit's ticket from Hemtabad in the last assembly elections was a surprise. But the bigger surprise was his winning the election. In the same year, he was made the chairman of the party in the district.
