= Itahar High School =

Itahar High School (H.S.)
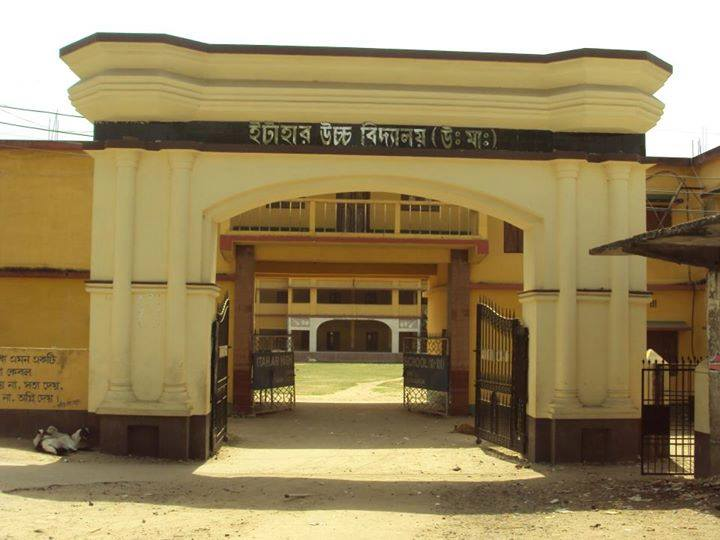
- Main Gate of the School

Location
- Itahar, West Bengal; India; 25.45038558°N 88.17219857°E

Information
- Motto: Education for advancement
- Established: 1935
- School district: Uttar Dinajpur
- Head teacher: Subrata Narayan Dhar
- Language: Bengali (বাংলা)
- Colors: White; Red; White; Navy Blue
- Affiliations: WBBSE and WBCHSE

Itahar High School (H.S.) is a secondary school in Itahar, Uttar Dinajpur in West Bengal. It was founded in 1935. It is under the WBBSE & WBCHSE. There are science, arts and commerce courses for eleventh and twelfth grades.

== Headmasters ==
No.	Name	Time Period
1	Sri Hemanta Kr. Roy	12/01/1935 to 31/12/1941
2	Sri Anil Chowdhury	01/01/1942 to 28/02/1956
3	Naresh Ch. Mitra	01/03/1956 to 28/02/1961
4	Salil Kr. Guha	01/03/1961 to 04/02/1970
5	Jogendar Nath Majumder (T I C)	16/02/1970 to 08/02/1971
6	Provat Kr. Nandi	09/02/1971 to 15/02/1973
7	Jogendar Nath Majumder (T I C)	16/02/1973 to 15/08/1973
8	Ajit Kr. Karmakar	16/08/1973 to 31/01/1983
9	Shaktipada Acharjee (T I C)	01/02/1983 to 21/11/1983
10	Shyamal Kr. Bandyapadhya	22/11/1983 to 15/05/1985
11	Shaktipada Acharjee (T I C)	16/05/1985 to 31/07/1986
12	Amit Kr. Sarkar	01/08/1986 to 31/12/2010
13	Biplab Kr.Tarafdar	01/01/2011 to ../../2015
14	Jadab Kr. Chowdhury	2016
15	Subrata Narayan Dhar	2017

== School Uniform ==
=== Boys ===
Navy blue pant (half/full) and white shirt (half/full sleeve).

=== Girls ===
For class V-X, either 1) white shirt and sleeveless red frock or 2) white shirt and red skirt or 3) white salwar-kameez with red gauze scarf (odna). For class XI-XII, either 1) red blouse and white saree with red border (par) or 2) white salwar-kameez with red gauze scarf (odna).

== Stream ==
- Arts
- Science

=== Compulsory ===
- English

=== Science ===
- Mathematics
- Physics
- Chemistry
- Biology

=== Arts ===
- Geography
- Philosophy
- Computer Application
- Sanskrit
- History
- Political Science
- Sociology

=== Commerce ===
- Economics

== Cultural Program ==
"Kalpataru" is the annual magazine of this institute.
