= Shawkat Ali (novelist) =

- শওকত আলী
- Born: 12 February 1936; Raiganj, Dinajpur District, Bengal Presidency, British India (Now in West Bengal)
- Died: 25 January 2018 (aged 81); Dhaka, Bangladesh
- Education: University of Dhaka
- Awards: full list

Shawkat Ali (12 February 1936 – 25 January 2018) was a Bangladeshi writer. He was awarded Bangla Academy Literary Award in 1968 and Ekushey Padak in 1990 by the Government of Bangladesh.

== Early life and education ==
Ali was born in Raiganj in West Dinajpur district in British India. He completed his schooling from Raiganj Coronation High School. He passed his IA from Surendranath College, Dinajpur branch (which later evolved into Dinajpur Government College) in 1951 and BA in 1955. He completed his MA in Bengali literature from the University of Dhaka in 1958.

== Career ==
Ali started writing articles in newspapers in 1955. He started his career at the news desk of Dainik Millat in the same year. He worked in Thakurgaon as a schoolteacher for six months. He taught Bengali at Jagannath College in Dhaka between 1962 and 1987. He joined the Dhaka head office of District Gazetteer as an assistant director and later became its director. He was appointed principal of Government Music College in 1989 from where he retired in 1993.

== Works ==
Ali's notable novels include Prodoshe Prakritojon (1984), Opekkha (1984) and Dakkhinyaoner Din (1985). Prodoshe Prakritojon is his most notable – which tells the story of the oppression faced by the lower-caste people in the Sena Empire that ruled the Bengal through 11th and 12th centuries. Uttarer Khep was adapted into a film of the same name in 2000. The film won the Bangladesh National Film Award for Best Actress for the performance by Champa.

== Novels ==
- Pingal Akash (The Reddish-Brown Sky, 1963)
- Jaatra (Journey, 1976)
- Prodoshe Praakritajon (The Commoners in the Twilight, 1984)
- Apeksha (Waiting, 1985)
- Dakshinayaner Din (The Days of Southward Way, 1985)
- Kulyaai Kalasrot (Time the Flow of in a Bird's Nest, 1986)
- Purbaratri Purbadin (The Night Before, the Day Before, 1986)
- Sambal (Saving, 1986)
- Gantabye Atahpar (After towards Destinations, 1987)
- Bhalobasa Kare Kay (What is Love Called, 1988)
- Jete Chai (I want to Go, 1988)
- Warish (The Successor, 1989)
- Basar O Madhucandrima (Bride-Chamber and Honey Moon, 1990)
- Uttarer Khep (A Trip to the North, 1991)
- Tripodi (2002)

== Awards ==
- Bangla Academy Literary Award (1968)
- Humayun Kabir Memorial Award
- Lekhak Shibir Medal (1978)
- Ajit Guha Literary Prize (1982)
- Philips Literary Award (1986 and 1989)
- Ekushey Padak (1990)

== Personal life ==
Shawkat Ali resided all his life in Bangladesh.
