= Baroduary =

- Village
- Madhupur Baroduary
- Location in West Bengal, India Baroduary (India)
- Coordinates: 25.617950°N 88.125600°E
- Country: India
- State: West Bengal
- District: Uttar Dinajpur

Government
  - Body: Gram panchayat
- Time zone: UTC+5:30 (IST)
- Vehicle registration: WB
- Website: uttardinajpur.nic.in

Baroduary is a village in Raiganj in Uttar Dinajpur district, state of West Bengal, India.

== History ==
According to villagers the name of that is Baroduary means "a palace with twelve doors". Baro means "twelve" and Duary means "the one with doors"; thus, the total sums up to "the twelve with doors".Baroduary is basically known for Hat (Hat means Bazaar), every week Saturday many nearest Village Peoples comes for shopping. Years of 1995 to nearest village Madhupur are merged with Baroduary and the Post office named as Madhupur Baruduary. The village under now in Madhupur Sansad.

== Demographics ==
As per the 2011 Census of India, Madhupur had a total population of 9,045, of which 5,220 (58%) were males and 4,746 (42%) were females. (95%) Hindus family and (5%) are Muslims.

== Tradition ==
- Baroduary Junior High school ( Class 5 to Class 8)
- Baroduary Free Primary School (Class Nursery to class 4)
- Shiva Temple. Every year makes a fair for Shiv Puja and area club arranged a Boul songs stage.
- Durga Puja
