= Itahar, Uttar Dinajpur =

Itahar
- Census Town
- Location in West Bengal, India# India Itahar (India)
- Coordinates: 25.4587°N 88.1722°E
- Country: India
- State: West Bengal
- District: Uttar Dinajpur

Population (2011)
  - Total: 6,022

Languages
  - Official: Bengali, English
- Time zone: UTC+5:30 (IST)
- Lok Sabha constituency: Raiganj
- Vidhan Sabha constituency: Itahar
- Website: uttardinajpur.nic.in

Itahar is a census town in Itahar CD block in Raiganj subdivision of Uttar Dinajpur district in the state of West Bengal, India.

== Geography ==
Cities and towns in the Uttar Dinajpur district
M: municipal city/ town, CT: census town, R: rural/ urban centre, T: tourist centre
Owing to space constraints in the small map, the actual locations in a larger map may vary slightly

=== Location ===
Itahar is located at 25.4587°N 88.1722°E

In the map alongside, all places marked on the map are linked in the full screen version.

=== Police station ===
Itahar police station under West Bengal police has jurisdiction over Itahar CD block. It is 30 km from the district headquarters and covers an area of 364.17 km^{2}.

=== CD block HQ ===
The headquarters of Itahar CD block is at Itahar town.

== Demographics ==
As per the 2011 Census of India, Itahar had a total population of 6,022, of which 3,024 (50%) were males and 2,998 (50%) were females. Population below 6 years was 624. The total number of literates in Itahar was 4,196 (77.73% of the population over 6 years).

== Transport ==
New broad gauge lines – Gazole-Itahar (27.20 km), Itahar-Raiganj (22.16 km) and Itahar-Buniadpur (27.095 km) – as a material modification of the Eklakhi-Balurghat project (commissioned in 2004) was included in the budget 1983-84. Initial work for the lines has been taken up by Northeast Frontier Railway. 431.973 ha of land is to be acquired. Land acquisition has commenced in the Gazole-Itahar sector with initial fund sanctions. As of August 2018, further sanctions are awaited. The Eklakhi–Balurghat branch line was taken up in 1983-84.

National Highway 12 (old number NH 34) passes through Itahar.

== Education ==
Dr. Meghnad Saha College was established in 2000 at Village: Ranipur, PO Tilna, PS Itahar. Affiliated to the University of Gour Banga, it offers honours courses in Bengali, English, sociology, history, political science, geography and mathematics and general courses in arts and science.

Moulana Abul Kalam Azad B.Ed. College was established in 2005 at Village: Bagbari, PO Itahar.

Itahar High School is a Bengali-medium coeducational higher secondary school in Itahar. Founded in 1935, it has arrangements for teaching from class VI to XII. It has 25 computers, a library and a play ground.

Itahar Girls High School is a Bengali-medium girls only higher secondary school. Founded in 1973, it has arrangements for teaching from class V to XII, It has 14 computers and a library.

Kapasia A.M High School is a Bengali-medium coeducational higher secondary school. Vill & P.O-Kapasia, P.S-Itahar, Dist-Uttar Dinajpur. Founded in 1947, it has arrangements for teaching from class V to XII. It has a computer lab, a library and a big play ground.

CHURAMAN P.C HIGH SCHOOL is a Bengali-medium coeducational higher secondary school. Vill & P.O-Churaman, P.S-Itahar, Dist-Uttar Dinajpur. Founded in 1864. This is the oldest school in the district, it has arrangements for teaching from class V to XII. It has a computer lab, a library and a big play ground.

== Healthcare ==
Itahar rural hospital at Itahar (with 30 beds) is the main medical facility in Itahar CD block.
