= Raiganj Coronation High School =

School in Raiganj, West Bengal, India

Location
- Ward no. 5, Vivekananda More; Raiganj, West Bengal, 733134; India; 23.2223104°N 88.3572479°E

Information
- Established: 1911
- Sister school: Raiganj Girls High School
- School district: Uttar Dinajpur district
- Headmaster: Kalicharan Saha
- Gender: Co-ed
- Language: Bengali. Bengali and English in class 11-12
- Campus type: Urban
- Colours: Aqua & Navy
- Rival: Raiganj Sri Sri Ramkrishna Vidyabhaban
- Affiliation: WBBSE & WBCHSE
- Website: www.raiganjcoronation.co.in

Raiganj Coronation High School is a higher secondary school for boys and girls situated at the Raiganj Municipality of Uttar Dinajpur district in Indian state of West Bengal.

In 2010, the West Bengal School Education Department granted permission to the school to introduce an English-medium section for science and commerce students in HS.

== History ==
Raiganj Coronation High School (H.S.) was established on 17 January 1911. A group of enlightened persons headed by Sri Kulada Kanta Ghosh, the founder Secretary of the School played the pivotal role in the establishment of the school. The school was named such because it was the year of the coronation of King George V. After independence, efforts had been made to do away with the word "coronation" but it could not be actualized as yet.

=== Before 1911 ===
Prior to 17 January 1911, the school was known as Raiganj Middle English School. In 1908 Sri Kulada Kanta Ghosh of Raiganj attended the "Congress Conference" held at Bombay. Inspired by nationalistic educational philosophy, Sri Ghosh on returning from the conference devoted himself along with like-minded persons towards setting up a school to cater the need of spreading education among the children of Raiganj. As a result, Raiganj Middle East School which was established in 1905, came to known as Raiganj Coronation High English School w.e.f. 17 January 1911. The entire land required for the school building and the playground was donated by Late Maharaja Girija Nath Rai Bahadur of Dinajpur.

== The Freedom Movement and the School ==
Sri Kulada Kanta Ghosh, the founder Secretary of the school was a staunch supporter of the freedom movement. Among the teaching staff Damodar Pramanik, H.M. and Arun Chandra Ghosh, A.T were indirectly but closely associated with the movement. A group of students namely Sukumar Guha, Rabindranath Bhowmik, Anil Nag, Sucharu Guha, Kamal Bhowmik, Abinash Dutta and other courted arrest for actively participating in the August movement, in 1942. Monoranjan Saha and some other students of the school were arrested for taking active part in the Non-co-operation and Civil Disobedience Movement.

The name of Saroj Basu alias Kalketu Basu, a student of the school was the main spring behind the great Hili-Darjelling Mail Robbery case of 1933. Saroj Basu was arrested and was given death entrenchment. Later, following an appeal made before the Calcutta High Court, he was given ten years imprisonment.

Sri Shyma Prasad Barman, a student of the second Matriculation Batch of the school in 1916 was closely associated with the movement launched by the Congress from time to time and after independence became a minister and continued for 11 years in the Cabinet of Dr. B.C. Roy, Chief Minister of West Bengal. Dr. Roy took active interest in the activity of the school. He visited the school on 27 September 1958 and opened the 'New Block' of the school. In 1946, communal violence took the worst shape at Noakhali. A group of students of the school along with cash and kinds, contributed by the people of the locality went to Noakhali and stretched out helping hand to the victims of the communal violence.

== Controversies ==
In August 2005, a teacher at the school was show-caused for sending MMS to a local woman. The headmaster of the school was terminated from his post for deliberately preventing the newly appointed English teacher to join the school and for supplying wrong info to the higher authorities. In March 2022, the Calcutta High Court directed the school authorities to arrange for her joining in within 48 hours of the court verdict.

== Incidents ==
On 31 December 2014, there was a theft at the school hostel. The thieves were reportedly to have stolen stuff worth ₹10,000 from 10 hostel rooms. In response, one person was arrested and the police advised to the school to install CCTV in its premises. In 2023, the school authorities complained that the Raiganj Municipality had illegally occupied the school playground. But the municipal authorities mentioned that they were only temporarily using the ground for distributing government policies to the local people.

== Notable Alummi ==
- Shawkat Ali

== See also ==
- Education in India
- List of schools in India
- Education in West Bengal
