= Haripada Barman =

Indian politician

Member of the West Bengal Legislative Assembly
- Incumbent
- Assumed office 4 May 2026
- Preceded by: Satyajit Barman
- Constituency: Hemtabad Assembly constituency

Personal details
- Party: Bharatiya Janata Party
- Profession: Politician

Haripada Barman is an Indian politician and member of the Bharatiya Janata Party. He was elected as a Member of the West Bengal Legislative Assembly from the Hemtabad constituency in the 2026 West Bengal Legislative Assembly election.
