= Bindole =

Village in West Bengal, India

Baganpara Baganpara
- Village
- Location in West Bengal Location in India
- Coordinates: 25°44′16″N 88°11′23″E
- Country: India
- State: West Bengal
- District: Uttar Dinajpur
- Administrative subdivision: Raiganj

Area
  - Total: 1.54 km^{2} (0.59 sq mi)
- Elevation: 37 m (121 ft)
- Time zone: UTC+5:30 (IST)
- Postal code: 733156
- Area code: 03523

Baganpara (Hindi: Baganpara) is a village in Raiganj subdivsion, Uttar Dinajpur, West Bengal, India near the Bangladesh-India border. As of 2025, one main road ( Maharaja Hat to Baganpara Road )passes through Baganpara, along with six other smaller roads. The village has around 200 buildings including a teachers' college, a clinic, a pharmacy, a photography studio, a tech repair shop, two hairdressers, two supermarkets, a tailor shop, a baby shop, a school, a mosque and three Hindu temples, one of which is the notable tourist destination Temple of Goddess Bhairabi.
