= Raiganj Surendranath Mahavidyalaya =

College in West Bengal

- Type: Undergraduate college Public college
- Established: 1986; 40 years ago
- Academic affiliations: University of Gour Banga
- Principal: Dr. Chandan Roy
- Location: Raiganj, West Bengal, 733134, India; 25.6344379°N 88.1290009°E
- Website: https://rsmraiganj.in/
- Location within West Bengal Location within India

Raiganj Surendranath Mahavidyalaya is a college in Raiganj in the Uttar Dinajpur district of West Bengal, India. The college is affiliated to University of Gour Banga, offering undergraduate courses.

== History ==
On 10 October 1986 Ad hoc Governing Body decided to open a college in Raiganj. In November 1986 the institution was officially established and Dr. Dhrendra Kumar Das joined as first principal of the college. Second Meeting of Ad-hoc Committee decided 14 November 1986 to be the formal opening of the College.In 4 September 1992 Statutory Governing Body was formed and Hon'ble District Magistrate Mr. Siddharth, IAS was selected as the first President of the Governing Body. Dr. Dhirendra Kumar Das joined as First Principal of the College on 12 June 1995. The College received UGC recognition of 2(f) and 12B on 24 June 1997. Dr. Prabir Roy joined college as Second Principal on 24 June 2003. The College was accredited by NAAC at B+ Level in December, 2016. Dr. Chandan Roy joined college as Third Principal on 16 May 2023. The College was re-accredited by NAAC in its second cycle with "B+ Grade" with a commendable CGPA 2.7 (valid for 5 years from 6-6-2025)

== Departments ==
=== Science ===
- Chemistry
- Physics
- Mathematics
- Botany
- Zoology

=== Arts ===
- Bengali (Major, Minor)
- English (Major, Minor)
- History (Major, Minor)
- Geography (Minor)
- Political Science (Major, Minor)
- Sociology (Major, Minor)
- Education (Major, Minor)
- Economics (Major, Minor)
- Philosophy (Minor)
- Sanskrit (Minor)
- Physical Education (Minor)
- Urdu (Minor)

== Accreditation ==
In 2016 the college was awarded a B+ grade by the National Assessment and Accreditation Council (NAAC). The college is also recognized by the University Grants Commission (UGC). In the year 2025, the College was re-accredited by NAAC in its second cycle with "B+ Grade" with a commendable CGPA 2.7 (valid for 5 years from 6 June 2025)

== See also ==
- List of institutions of higher education in West Bengal
- Education in India
- Education in West Bengal
