= Nimai Chandra Saha =

Indian academic

Vice Chancellor of The University Of Burdwan
- Incumbent
- Assumed office 1 November 2016
- Chancellor: Governor of West Bengal
- Preceded by: Smritikumar Sarkar
- Succeeded by: Himself

Director, directorate of Public Instruction (West Bengal)
- In office 2015–2016

Personal details
- Occupation: Academic

Nimai Chandra Saha (born 29 March 1960) is an Indian academic and the former vice-chancellor of the University of Burdwan, India.

== Career ==
Saha passed M.Sc. in Zoology from University of Kalyani in 1982. He completed D.Sc. from Raiganj University. Saha became the reader of Presidency College, Kolkata. He served as Principal in number of colleges in West Bengal. He became the Directorate of Public Instruction under the Govt. of West Bengal in 2015. Saha was appointed as Vice Chancellor of the University of Burdwan on 1 November 2016.
