= Raiganj Wildlife Sanctuary =

Wildlife sanctuary in India

- Kulik Bird Sanctuary
- IUCN category IV (habitat/species management area)
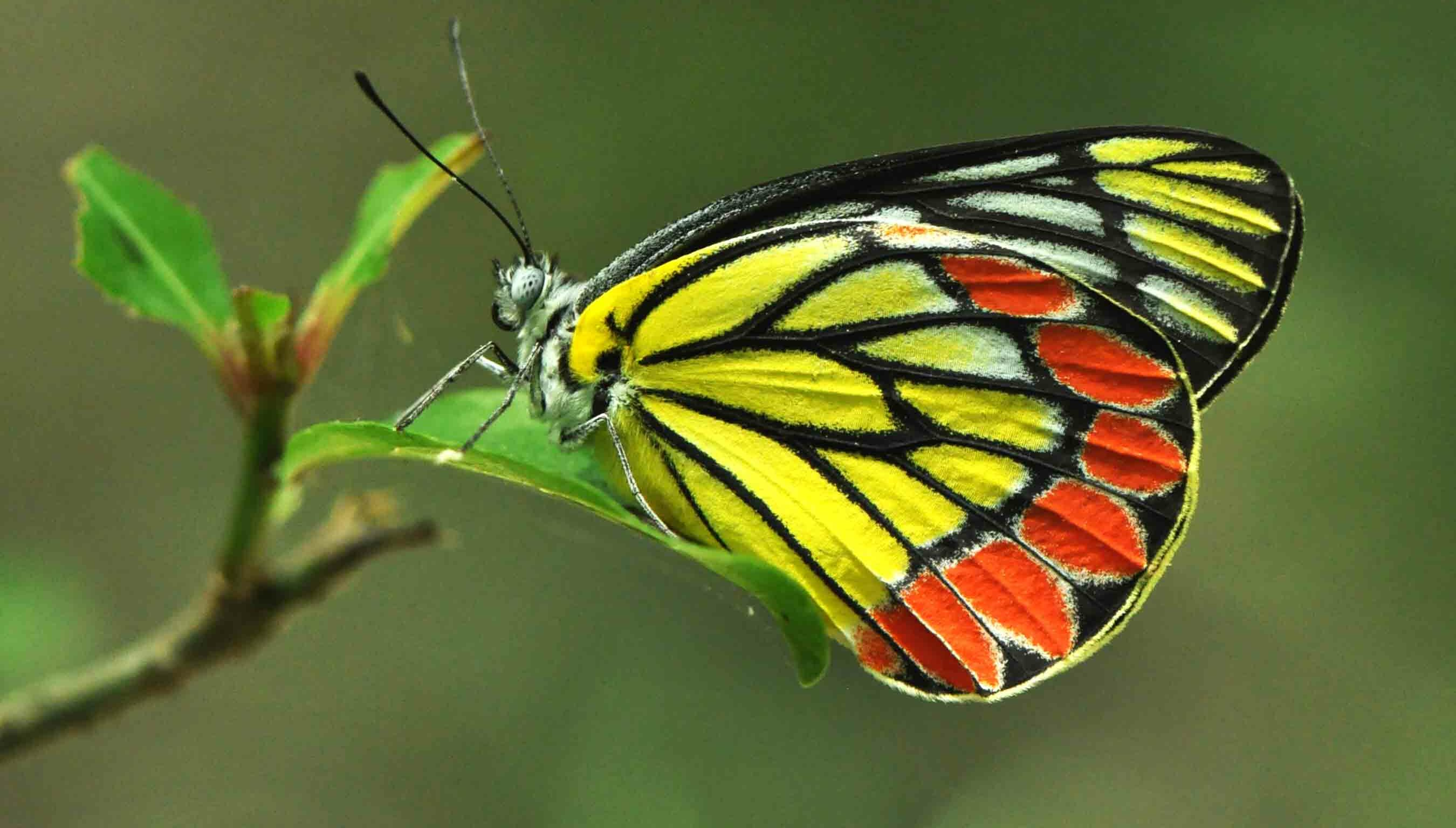
- Common Jezebel at Raiganj Wildlife Sanctuary

- Location within West Bengal Location within India
- Interactive map of Raiganj Wildlife Sanctuary
- Location: West Bengal, India
- Nearest city: Raiganj
- Coordinates: 25°38′13″N 88°07′16″E
- Area: 1.3 square kilometres (0.50 sq mi)
- Established: 1985
- Governing body: Forest Department, Govt. of West Bengal

Raiganj Wildlife Sanctuary (Raegônj Bonnoprani Ôbhôearonno) (also popularly known as Kulik Bird Sanctuary) is situated near Raiganj in Uttar Dinajpur district in the Indian state of West Bengal. The bird sanctuary is home to 164 species of birds, and some 90,000 to 100,000 migratory birds visit the sanctuary every year. As per the MEE report, West Bengal''s Jaldapara national park and Raiganj wildlife sanctuary, Himachal Pradesh''s Sainj and Tirthan wildlife sanctuaries as well as the Great Himalayan national park have been declared as top five national parks and wildlife sanctuaries in India.

== Geography ==
Cities and towns in the Uttar Dinajpur district
M: municipal city/ town, CT: census town, R: rural/ urban centre, T: tourist centre
Owing to space constraints in the small map, the actual locations in a larger map may vary slightly

=== Location ===
It is located 4 km (2.5 mi) north from the centre of Raiganj town, the district headquarters. National Highway 34 runs beside the sanctuary. Raiganj is 425 km (264 mi) from Kolkata and 181 km (112 mi) from Siliguri.

In the map alongside, all places marked on the map are linked in the full screen version.

=== Climate ===
Temperature (degrees Celsius): summer - max. 39, min. 21; winter - max. 23, min. 6. Rainfall: 1,550 mm (July to September).

== History ==
The development of the area began in 1970, as part of the social forestry programme of the Government of West Bengal. The department planted tree species like kadam, jarul, sisoo (Dalbergia sisoo) and eucalyptus which were classified as tropical dry deciduous forest. With the Asian openbill and other species of migratory birds flocking to the artificial forest during the hatching season, it was officially designated as the "Raiganj Wildlife Sanctuary" in the year 1985.

== Sanctuary ==
It is claimed by some to be the largest bird sanctuary in Asia. However, there are other claimants to that distinction, such as Harike Pattan sanctuary, spread over 93 square miles (240 km^{2}), in Tarn Taran district of Punjab. Bharatpur Bird Sanctuary, now known as Keoladeo National Park is considered the largest in Asia.

Several types of migratory birds arrive here each year from South Asian countries and coastal regions. They start arriving from June. The migratory species include open-bill storks, egrets, night herons and cormorants. The resident birds are kites, flycatchers, owls, kingfishers, woodpeckers, drongoes, etc.

According to a 2002 census, 77,012 birds visited the sanctuary that year. Some 90,000 to 100,000 migratory birds visit the sanctuary every year.

Here is a description from a visitor: "On our way out from Kolkata to Raiganj, we were about to cross the bridge over the Kulik river on National Highway 34 when we saw hundreds of storks circling a patch of forest across the river. Intuitively, I knew we had arrived... Once up there (tourist lodge observatory)... we saw that all the 30-odd trees in the lodge compound were occupied by hundreds of open-billed storks... During our half-hour in the observatory, we saw flocks flying overhead carrying twigs to build their nests. Those that already had nests were busy sitting on eggs or tending to hatchlings. It was equally fascinating watching some taking time off from family chores to preen themselves and smooth ruffled feathers."

== Heronry ==
Birds at the heronry

- Asian openbill stork
- Little egret.
- Little cormorant
- Night heron
- Pond heron

The time of formation of heronry is July to December. Asian openbill storks generally start nesting during mid-June, though the migration depends upon the rain. If monsoon starts early, the Asian openbill comes early. The other four species start nesting in mid-May.

== Tourism ==
The number of tourists visiting the sanctuary has been rising. The district administration has constructed the Raiganj Kulik Park close to the sanctuary, with the objective of enhancing the beauty of the area. Funds were collected from Border Area Development Project, MP Local Area Development Fund, Tenth Finance, Uttar Banga Unnayan Parshad, Rastriya Samavikash Yojona, National Food For Work and MLA Local Area Development Fund.

During the period from December to February, numerous visitors from districts of West Bengal and Bihar visit the sanctuary, and a large number of them organise picnics. They not only disturb the birds but also degrade the local environment. The Raiganj social forestry division has decided to construct a picnic spot at Bhattadighi nearby, with water facilities, some shades, toilets, a small park and a foot track.

In February 2011, a nature interpretation centre was added to Raiganj Wildlife Sanctuary.
