= Raiganj University =

Public university in Raiganj, West Bengal, India

- রায়গঞ্জ বিশ্ববিদ্যালয়
- Former name: Raiganj College (University College)
- Motto: tamaso mā jyotirgamaya
- Motto in English: Lead me from darkness to light
- Type: Public State University
- Established: 3 February 2015 (11 years ago)
- Academic affiliations: UGC; AIU
- Budget: ₹35.24 crore (US$3.8 million) (FY2024–25 est.)
- Chancellor: Governor of West Bengal
- Vice-Chancellor: Arnab Sen
- Academic staff: 113 (2025)
- Students: 6,706 (2025)
- Undergraduates: 4,514 (2025)
- Postgraduates: 1,007 (2025)
- Doctoral students: 1,185 (2025)
- Location: Raiganj, West Bengal, India; 25°36′18.31″N 88°7′42.92″E
- Campus: Urban 12.36 acres (5.00 ha)
- Website: raiganjuniversity.ac.in

Raiganj University is a public state university in Raiganj, Uttar Dinajpur district, West Bengal, India. It is the oldest higher educational institution in the North Dinajpur district. This institution was elevated to the status of a public state university on 3 February 2015 by an Act of the West Bengal legislature after functioning as a constituent college of the University of North Bengal for a long time. This university offers undergraduate, postgraduate, and doctoral level courses.

== History ==
As a result of the partition of India, many people came over to the border districts of West Dinajpur and Raiganj, which provided many of them with food and shelter. The education of their children was a necessity for these uprooted people to change their fortune. At this point in time, few educationalists and social thinkers in this small town felt the necessity of building a college for higher education in this backward region. Because of the efforts of Late Sukumar Guha and Late Nirmal Chandra Ghosh, a meeting was organized among local eminent citizens and interested persons, which unanimously decided to establish a college for higher education and appealed to the people to donate land and money for this purpose. The college was then formally opened in 1948 as an affiliated college of the University of Calcutta.

With the establishment of the University of North Bengal in the year 1962 at the northern part of West Bengal, the affiliation of the college changed from the University of Calcutta to the University of North Bengal. Different Honours degree courses were introduced gradually. In the year 1968, University of North Bengal took the decision to take over the Raiganj College as a university college with all its assets and liabilities. Subsequently, the name of the Raiganj College was changed to Raiganj College (University College).

In the year 2013, Chief Minister of West Bengal Mamata Banerjee visited Raiganj for an administrative meeting and announced that Raiganj College (University College) will be upgraded to a full-fledged university. Later the university was established on 3 February 2015 as per the Raiganj University Act.

== Campus and Location ==
Raiganj University is located in the heart of Raiganj town, the district headquarter of Uttar Dinajpur. It currently has only one permanent campus. Area of main campus is 25 acres.

== Organization and Administration ==
=== Governance ===
The Vice-chancellor of Raiganj University is the chief executive officer of the university. Prof. Arnab Sen is the current Vice-chancellor of the university.

List of All Vice-Chancellors
No.	Name
1.	Prof. Anil Bhuimali
2.	Prof. Sanchari Roy Mukherjee
3.	Prof. Jyotsna Kumar Mandal
4.	Prof. Dipak Kumar Roy
5.	Prof. Arnab Sen (present)

=== Faculties and Departments ===
Faculties and Departments of Raiganj University
Faculty	Departments
Science and Management	Mathematics; Physics; Chemistry; Computer & Information Science; Statistics; Microbiology; Sericulture; Botany; Zoology; Management (Business Administration)
Arts, Commerce & Law	Bengali; English; Sanskrit; History; Political Science; Philosophy; Economics; Education; Geography; Sociology; Commerce; Law

== Academics ==
=== Admission ===
The university follows the government policy for admission. Pass in the higher secondary (10+2) examination is necessary for admission to the undergraduate courses of Raiganj University. For admission in the doctoral and postgraduate level courses, one has to take an entrance examination either conducted by the university or by a national agency like CSIR or UGC.

=== Accreditation ===
Raiganj University is recognized under Section 2(f) and 12(B) of the UGC Act. It has not received accreditation from NAAC and NBA.

== Notable alumni ==
- Dipak Giri, Indian writer and academic
- Nimai Chandra Saha, Indian academic
- Priya Ranjan Dasmunsi, Indian Politician
