= Hemtabad Assembly constituency =

Hemtabad (SC)
- Constituency No. 33 for the West Bengal Legislative Assembly
- Interactive Map Outlining Hemtabad Assembly Constituency

Constituency details
- Country: India
- Region: East India
- State: West Bengal
- District: Uttar Dinajpur
- Lok Sabha constituency: Raiganj
- Established: 2011
- Total electors: 246,863
- Reservation: SC

Member of Legislative Assembly
- 18th West Bengal Legislative Assembly
- Incumbent Haripada Barman
- Party: Bharatiya Janata Party
- Elected year: 2026

Hemtabad (SC) is an assembly constituency in Uttar Dinajpur district in the Indian state of West Bengal. It is reserved for scheduled castes.

== Overview ==
As per orders of the Delimitation Commission, No. 33 Hemtabad Assembly constituency (SC) covers Hemtabad community development block and Bhatol, Bindol, Jagadishpur, Mahipur, Sherpur, Rampur and Sitgram gram panchayats of Raiganj community development block.

Hemtabad Assembly constituency is part of No. 5 Raiganj (Lok Sabha constituency).

== Members of the Legislative Assembly ==
Year	Name	Party
2011	Khagendra Nath Sinha	Communist Party of India
2016	Debendra Nath Roy	Communist Party of India
2021	Satyajit Barman	All India Trinamool Congress
2026	Haripada Barman	Bharatiya Janata Party

== Election results ==
=== 2026 ===
In the 2026 West Bengal Legislative Assembly election, Haripada Barman of BJP defeated his nearest rival outgoing mla Satyajit Barman of TMC by 12361 votes.

2026 West Bengal Legislative Assembly election: Hemtabad (SC)
Party	Candidate	Votes	%	±%
BJP	Haripada Barman	115,529	48.26	▲8.31
AITC	Satyajit Barman	103,168	43.1	▼9.04
INC	Anamika Roy	9,587	4.01	
CPI(M)	Tanushree Das	5,017	2.1	▼2.13
NOTA	None of the above	757	0.32	▼0.65
Majority		12,361	5.16	▼7.03
Turnout		239,372	96.97	▲12.81
BJP gain from AITC		Swing	8.67	

=== 2021 ===
In the 2021 election, Satyajit Barman of Trinamool Congress defeated his nearest rival, Chandima Roy of BJP.

West Bengal assembly elections, 2021: Hemtabad (SC) constituency
Party	Candidate	Votes	%	±%
AITC	Satyajit Barman	116,425	52.14	
BJP	Chandima Roy	89,210	39.95	
CPI(M)	Bhupen Barman	9,453	4.23	
NOTA	None of the above	2,160	0.97	
Majority		27,215	12.19	
Turnout		223,301	84.16	
AITC gain from CPI(M)		Swing		

=== 2016 ===
In the 2016 election, Debendra Nath Roy of CPI(M) defeated Sabita Kshetry of Trinamool Congress.

West Bengal assembly elections, 2016: Hemtabad (SC) constituency
Party	Candidate	Votes	%	±%
CPI(M)	Debendra Nath Roy	80,419	40.67	−4.84
AITC	Sabita Kshetry	67,283	34.03	+11.23
BJP	Bhanu Ram Barman	40,795	20.63	+15.09
NOTA	None of the above	2,437	1.23	+1.23
BSP	Alakesh Barman	2,065	1.04	
SUCI(C)	Jyotirmay Barman	2,048	1.04	
Turnout		197,736	85.00	−0.01
CPI(M) hold		Swing		

Note- Later in 2019 Debendra Nath Roy joined BJP.

=== 2011 ===
In the 2011 election, Khagendra Nath Sinha of CPI(M) defeated Sekhar Chandra Roy of Trinamool Congress.

West Bengal assembly elections, 2011: Hemtabad (SC) constituency
Party	Candidate	Votes	%	±%
CPI(M)	Khagendra Nath Sinha	71,557	45.51	
AITC	Sekhar Chandra Roy	35,849	22.80	
Independent	Chitta Ranjan Ray	30,923	19.67	
BJP	Bhanu Ram Barman	8,708	5.54	
Independent	Mamata Adhikary	4,292	2.73	
RPI(A)	Mohanta Barman	2,300		
BSP	Pabitra Kumar Biswas	2,118		
Independent	Uttam Barman	1,496		
Turnout		157,239	85.01	

The Raiganj MP, Deepa Dasmunsi, campaigned for the rebel Congress candidate contesting from Hemtabad as an independent candidate, Chittaranjan Roy, who was suspended from the Congress Party.
