= Debendra Nath Roy =

Indian politician (1955–2020)

Member of West Bengal Legislative Assembly
- In office 2016–2020
- Preceded by: Khagendra Nath Sinha
- Constituency: Hemtabad

Personal details
- Born: 1955
- Died: 13 July 2020 (aged 64–65) Raiganj, West Bengal, India
- Party: Bharatiya Janata Party (2019–2020)
- Other political affiliations: Communist Party of India (Marxist) (before 2019)

Debendra Nath Roy (1955 – 13 July 2020) was an Indian politician. He was elected to the West Bengal Legislative Assembly from Hemtabad in the 2016 West Bengal Legislative Assembly election as a member of the Communist Party of India (Marxist) and later joined the Bharatiya Janata Party. In May 2019, he along with Subhranshu Roy, Tushar Kanti Bhattacharya and more than 50 Councillors joined the Bharatiya Janata Party in the presence of senior BJP leaders Mukul Roy and Kailash Vijayvargiya.

Roy was found dead on 13 July 2020, hanging in front of a shop at Balia More, Raiganj, with one hand tied with the same rope from which he was hanging, just 1 km away from his home. His family claimed that the death was not a suicide, and demanded an inquiry from the Central Bureau of Investigation.
