= Maharaja Hat =

Maharaja মহারাজা হাট
- Census Town
- Nickname: মহারাজা হাট
- Location in West Bengal, India Maharaja (India)
- Coordinates: 25.7142447°N 88.1099090°E
- Country: India
- State: West Bengal
- District: Uttar Dinajpur

Population (2011)
  - Total: 10,067

Languages
  - Official: Bengali, English
- Time zone: UTC+5:30 (IST)
- Postal code: 733156
- Vehicle registration: WB
- Website: uttardinajpur.nic.in

Maharaja Hat is a census town in Raiganj CD Block in Raiganj subdivision of Uttar Dinajpur district in the Indian state of West Bengal.

== Demographics ==
As per the 2011 Census of India, Maharaja Hat had a total population of 10,067, of which 5,221 (52%) were males and 4,846 (48%) were females. Population below 6 years was 914. The total number of literates in Maharaja Hat was 7,695 (84.07% of the population over 6 years).

As of 2001 India census, Maharaja Hat had a population of 9,842. Males constitute 53% of the population and females 47%. Maharaja Hat has an average literacy rate of 73%, higher than the national average of 59.5%: male literacy is 79%, and female literacy is 67%. In Kasba, 11% of the population is under 6 years of age.

== Education ==
- mahaharajahat high school
- mahaharajahat primary school
- mahaharajahat shishu thitha school
- Bimala shishu thitha
- Sarada shishu thitha
- H.B Group Public School
- Gurukul Public School

== Health ==
Maharaja Hat have a 1 hospital name Raiganj BPHC 10 bed avilivel,

== Transport ==
Mine highway Raiganj Bindol via Maharaja Hat this road is distinct Highway, and maharaja bhatol via runia Road,& Maharaja jikia via Panisalahat Road.

== Police Station ==
Maharaja Hat no Police Station Present C.M of West Bengal Mamata Banerjee during her reign as a announced Maharaja Hat New police Station

== Near Village ==
- Baganpara
- Adiar
- Najirpur
- Lohagara
- Arthagaram
- Rampur
- Lokhania
- Runia
- Halalpur
- Uttar Goalpara
- Tangra
- dusmal
- kumargari
- durgapur
- Gayash
