= Uttar Dinajpur district =

District in West Bengal, India

- District of West Bengal
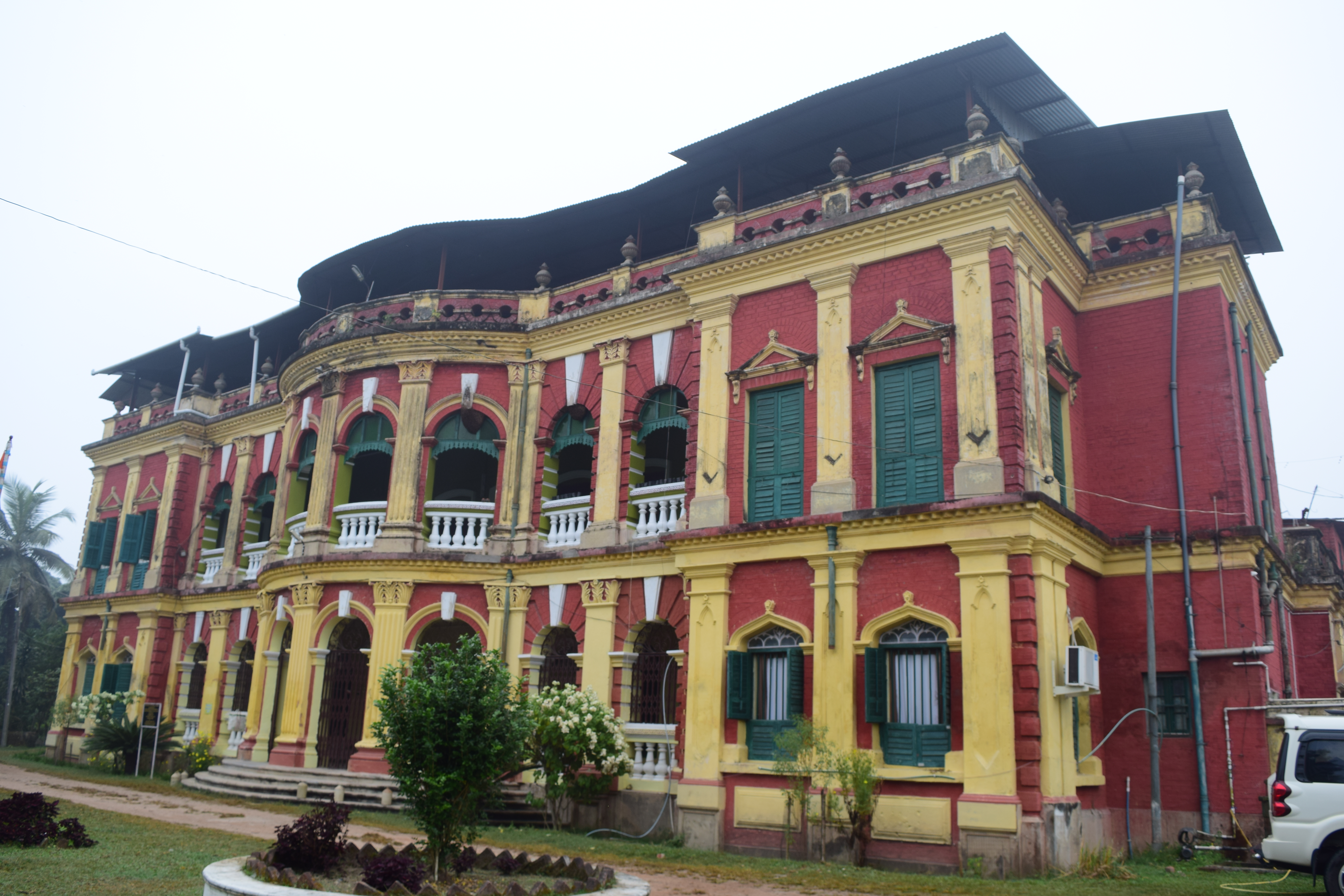
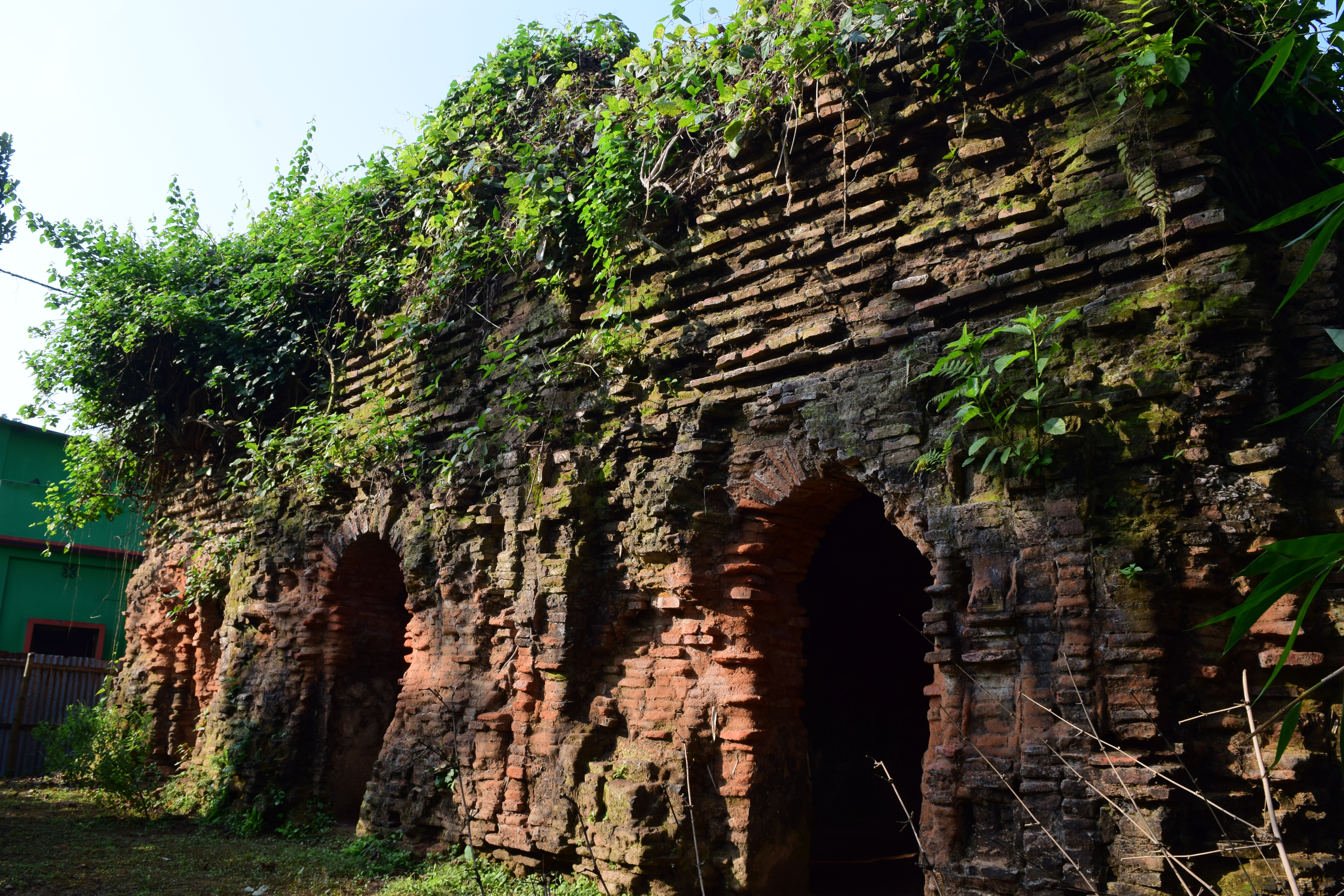
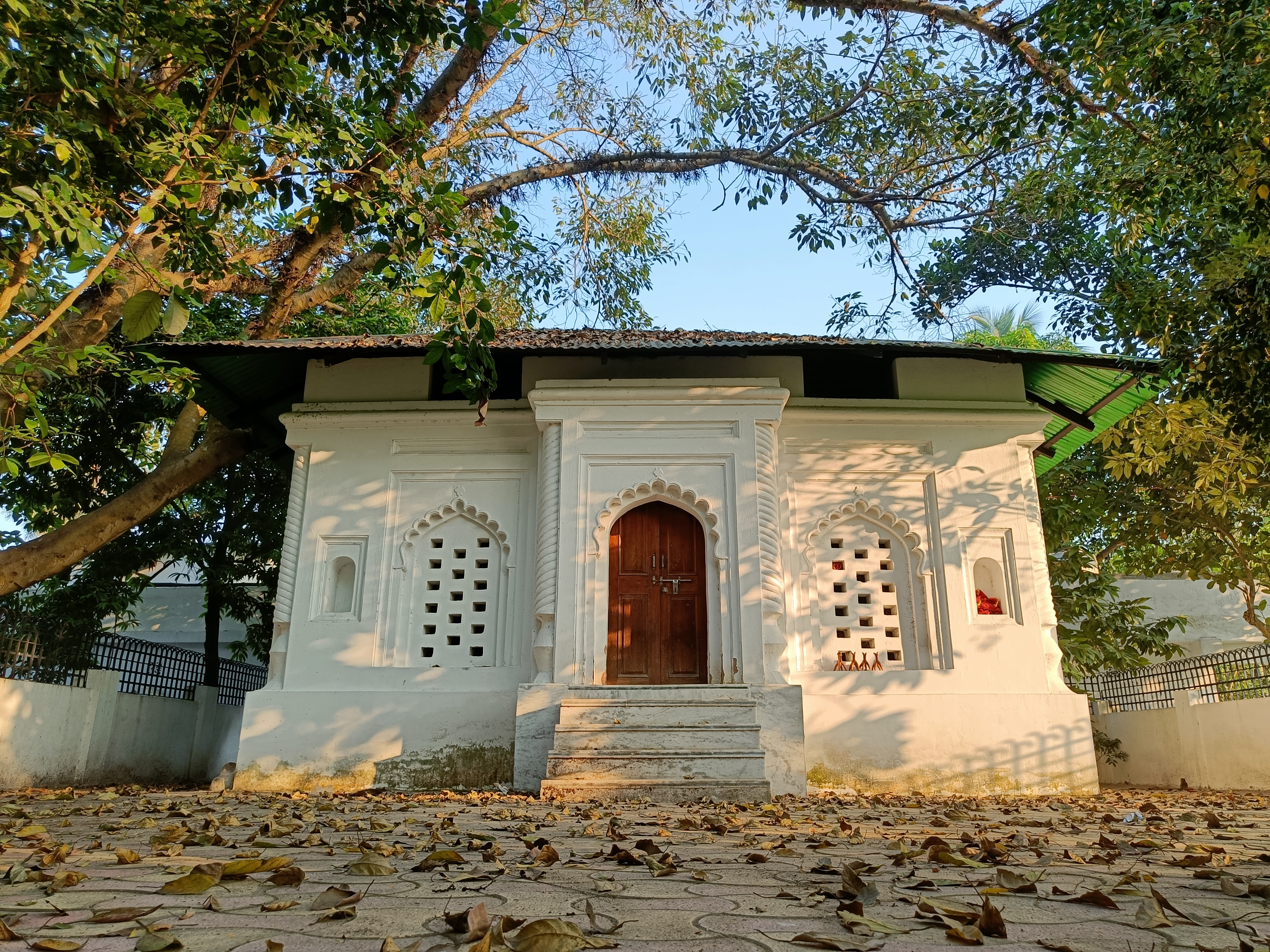
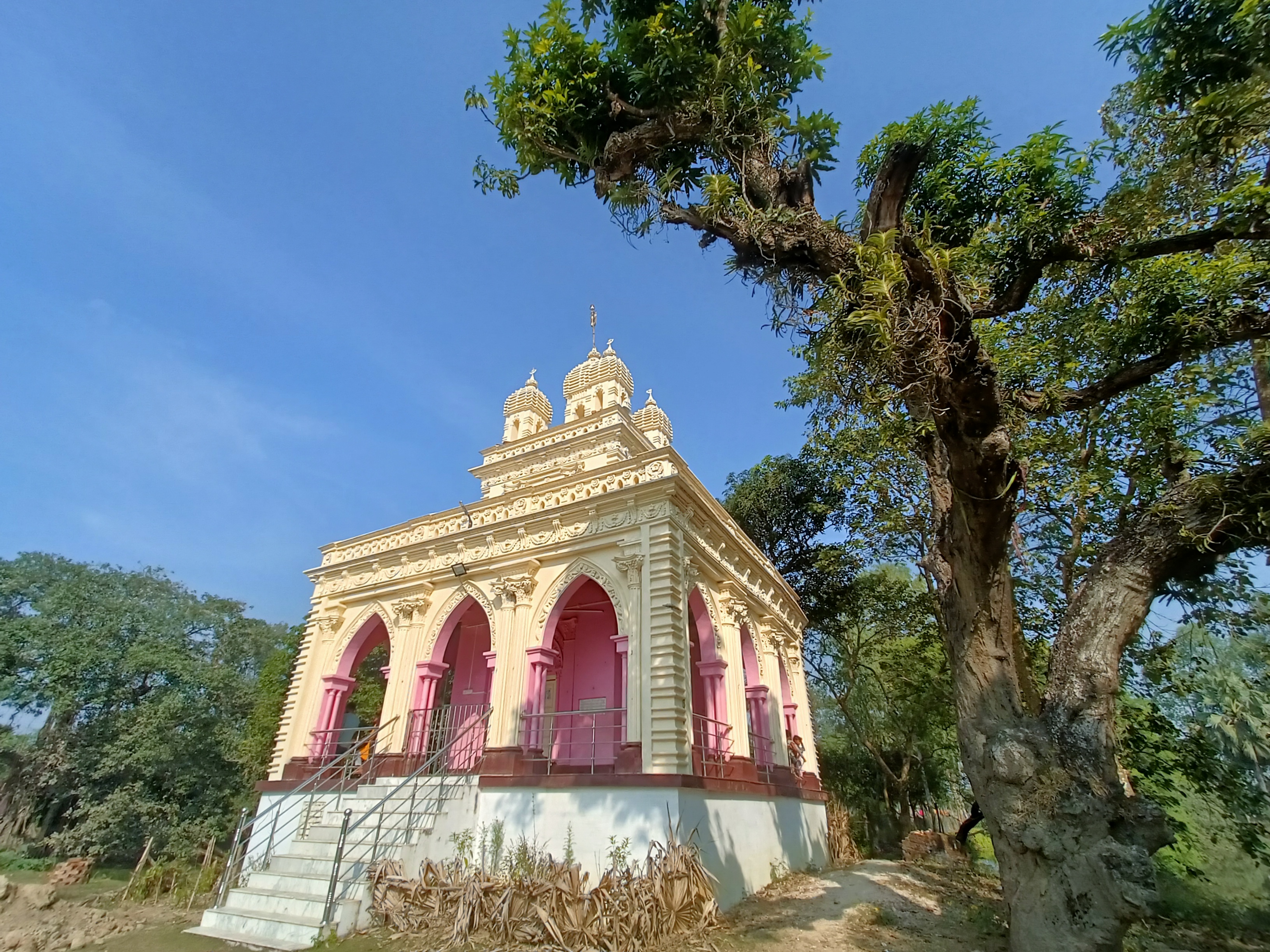
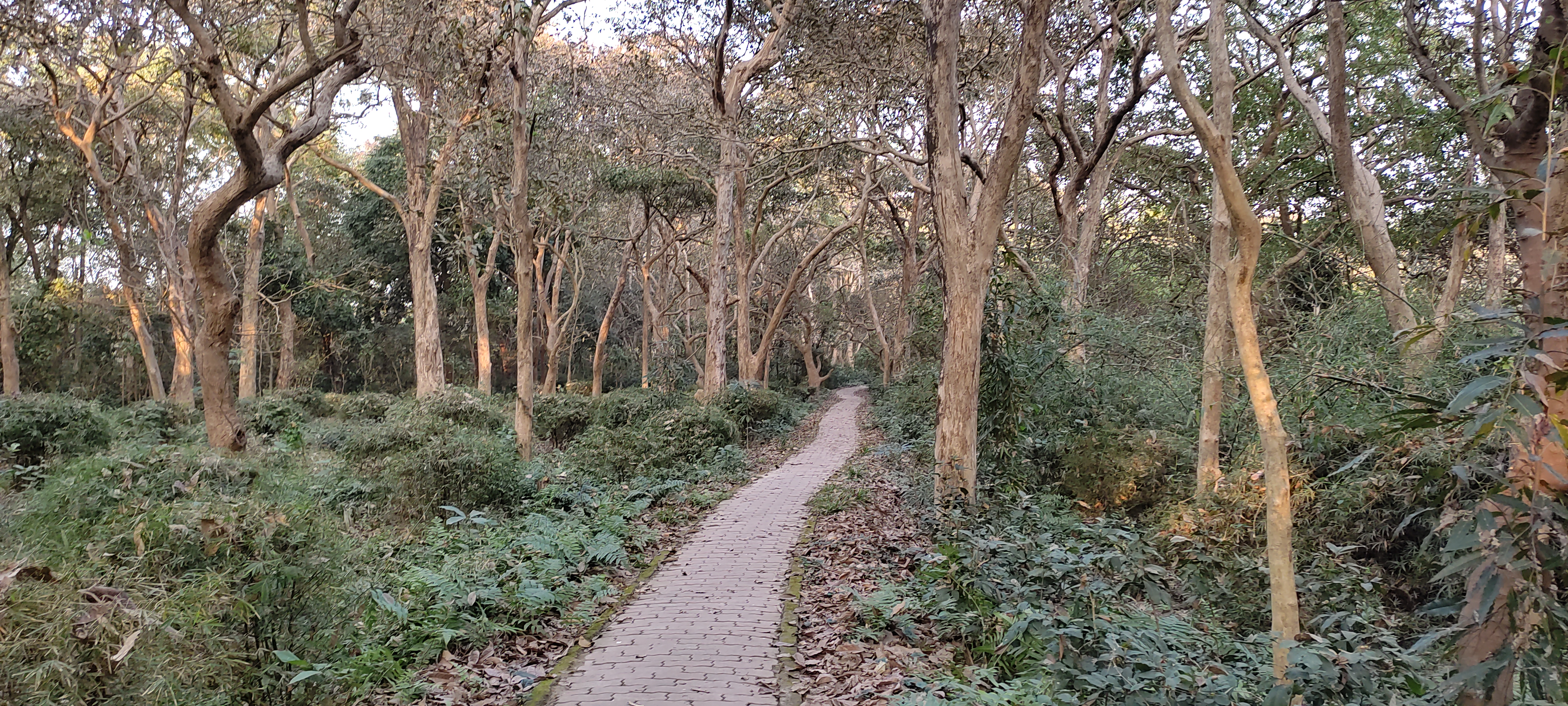
- From top-left: Durgapur Rajbari, Mohanta Masjid near Goyalpara, Pramateshwar Mahadeb Mondir, Kulik Bird Sanctuary, Pirpukur Dargah in Raiganj
- Interactive Map Outlining Uttar Dinajpur District
- Location of Uttar Dinajpur district in West Bengal
- Coordinates: 25.62°N 88.12°E
- Country: India
- State: West Bengal
- Division: Malda
- Headquarters: Raiganj

Government
  - Subdivisions: Raiganj Sadar, Islampur
  - CD Blocks: Raiganj, Hemtabad, Kaliaganj, Itahar, Islampur, Chopra, Goalpokhar I, Goalpokhar II, Karandighi
  - Lok Sabha constituencies: Raiganj
  - Vidhan Sabha constituencies: Chopra, Islampur, Goalpokhar, Chakulia, Karandighi, Hemtabad, Kaliaganj, Raiganj, Itahar

Area
  - Total: 3,140 km^{2} (1,210 sq mi)

Population (2011)
  - Total: 3,007,134
  - Density: 958/km^{2} (2,480/sq mi)
  - Urban: 362,228

Demographics
  - Literacy: 59.1 per cent
  - Sex ratio: 939 ♂/♀

Languages
  - Official: Bengali
  - Additional official: English
- Time zone: UTC+05:30 (IST)
- Website: uttardinajpur.nic.in

Uttar Dinajpur (Bengali pronunciation: [utːor dinad͡ʒpur]), also known as North Dinajpur, is one of the 23 districts of the state of West Bengal in India. The district is the part of Malda Division. Raiganj city is the headquarters of the district. This district bifurcated on 1 April 1992 from the erstwhile West Dinajpur district.

== History ==
Undivided Dinajpur district was part of the Pundra Kingdom of ancient Bengal.The whole of Pundra was part of the Mauryan empire, and Jainism was spread in the region in the fourth century BCE. Later multiple inscriptions show how the Guptas also controlled Pundra. After the reign of Guptas the district was ruled by Pala Empire from 750 CE. The Senas overthrew the Palas in the 12th century AD. In 1585, Mughal Emperor Akbar conquered Bengal and Dinajpur was controlled by the sarkars of Tajpur and Panjara. In 1765, it fell under the rule of the East India Company and was ruled from Murshidabad.In the later part of the 18th century, the district was home to the Sanyasi-Fakir rebellion until the early 19th century.The district remained relatively peaceful all through the rest of the 1800s. In 1905, the people of Dinajpur district protested against the Partition of Bengal. They participated in the Freedom struggle by refusing to pay tax, doing hartals, and launching agitations. In 1947, Dinajpur district was split between India and Pakistan with West Dinajpur remaining with India. In 1992, West Dinajpur district was bifurcated to form Uttar Dinajpur and Dakshin Dinajpur districts.

== Geography ==
Uttar Dinajpur district lies between latitude 25°11' N to 26°49' N and longitude 87°49' E to 90°00' E occupying an area of 3,142 km^{2} (1,213 sq mi) enclosed by Panchagarh, Thakurgaon and Dinajpur districts of Bangladesh on the east, Kishanganj, Purnia and Katihar districts of Bihar on the west, Darjeeling district and Jalpaiguri district on the north and Malda district and Dakshin Dinajpur district on the south. Uttar Dinajpur is well connected with the rest of the state through National Highways, State Highways and Railways. NH-27 and NH-12 pass through the heart of the district.

The regional topography is generally flat with a gentle southerly slope towards which the main rivers like Kulik, Nagar, Mahananda. The District forms a part of the basin lying between Rajmahal hills on the east. The older alluvium is estimated to be Pleistocene age. Uttar Dinajpur is bestowed with a very fertile soil. The soil is very rich in nature due to the alluvial deposition which helps to grow Paddy, Jute, Mesta and Sugarcane etc. Raiganj on the banks of the River Kulik is the District Headquarters where the Raiganj Wildlife Sanctuary, the second largest bird sanctuary in Asia, is situated. In Uttar Dinajpur district, there are two sub-divisions, Raiganj and Islampur, 110 km (68 mi) apart from each other. There are four municipalities, nine blocks and 99 Panchayats covering 1577 villages.

== Demographics ==
Historical population
Year	Pop.	±% p.a.
1901	401,121	—
1911	428,300	+0.66%
1921	376,366	−1.28%
1931	403,576	+0.70%
1941	451,684	+1.13%
1951	528,607	+1.59%
1961	760,199	+3.70%
1971	1,087,269	+3.64%
1981	1,415,653	+2.67%
1991	1,897,045	+2.97%
2001	2,441,794	+2.56%
2011	3,007,134	+2.10%

According to the 2011 census Uttar Dinajpur district has a population of 3,007,134, roughly equal to the nation of Albania or the US state of Mississippi. This gives it a ranking of 124th in India (out of a total of 640). The district has a population density of 956 inhabitants per square kilometre (2,480/sq mi) . Its population growth rate over the decade 2001-2011 was 22.9%. Uttar Dinajpur has a sex ratio of 936 females for every 1000 males, and a literacy rate of 59.1%. 12.05% of the population lives in urban areas. Scheduled Castes and Scheduled Tribes make up 26.87% and 5.41% of the population respectively.

=== Religion ===
Religion in Uttar Dinajpur district (2011)
	Percent
Islam	49.92%
Hinduism	49.31%
Christianity	0.56%
Others	0.21%

Religion in present-day Uttar Dinajpur district
Religion	Population (1941)	Percentage (1941)	Population (2011)	Percentage (2011)
Islam	266,415	53.61%	1,501,170	49.92%
Hinduism	200,051	40.25%	1,482,943	49.31%
Tribal religion	29,763	5.99%	1,622	0.05%
Others (Note: Including Jainism, Christianity, Buddhism, Zoroastrianism, Judaism, Ad-Dharmis, or not stated.)	740	0.15%	21,399	0.72%
Total population	496,969	100%	3,007,134	100%

Languages of Uttar Dinajpur district (2011).
1. Bengali (68.1%)
2. Surjapuri (13.2%)
3. Urdu (9.48%)
4. Santali (3.77%)
5. Hindi (3.76%)
6. Rajbongshi (1.03%)
7. Others (0.62%)

Population by religion in CD blocks
CD Block	Muslim	Hindu	Other
Chopra	62.01%	35.92%	2.07%
Islampur	72.13%	27.56%	0.31%
Goalpokhar I	77.26%	22.35%	0.39%
Goalpokhar II	64.14%	34.52%	1.34%
Karandighi	53.71%	45.74%	0.56%
Raiganj	34.14%	65.13 %	0.73%
Hemtabad	50.14%	49.25%	0.61%
Kaliaganj	20.55%	79.08%	0.37%
Itahar	51.98%	47.43%	0.59%

=== Language ===
According to the 2011 census, 68.06% of the population spoke Bengali, 13.22% Surjapuri, 9.48% Urdu, 3.77% Santali, 3.76% Hindi and 1.03% Rajbongshi as their first language.

== Divisions ==
=== Sub-divisions ===
Uttar Dinajpur District comprises two subdivisions:

- Raiganj Sub-Division and
- Islampur Sub-Division

=== Assembly constituencies ===
As per order of the Delimitation Commission in respect of the delimitation of constituencies in the West Bengal, the district is divided into nine assembly constituencies:

No.	Name	Lok Sabha	MLA	2021 Winner	2024 Lead
28	Chopra	Darjeeling	Hamidul Rahman	Trinamool Congress	Trinamool Congress
29	Islampur	Raiganj	Abdul Karim Chowdhury	Trinamool Congress	Trinamool Congress
30	Goalpokhar	Raiganj	Mohammad Ghulam Rabbani	Trinamool Congress	Trinamool Congress
31	Chakulia	Raiganj	Minhajul Arfin Azad	Trinamool Congress	Indian National Congress
32	Karandighi	Raiganj	Goutam Paul	Trinamool Congress	Bharatiya Janata Party
33	Hemtabad (SC)	Raiganj	Satyajit Barman	Trinamool Congress	Bharatiya Janata Party
34	Kaliaganj (SC)	Raiganj	Soumen Roy	Bharatiya Janata Party	Bharatiya Janata Party
35	Raiganj	Raiganj	Krishna Kalyani	Trinamool Congress	Bharatiya Janata Party
36	Itahar	Balurghat	Mosaraf Hussen	Trinamool Congress	Trinamool Congress

Hemtabad and Kaliaganj constituencies are reserved for Scheduled Castes (SC) candidates. Along with six assembly constituencies from Darjeeling district, Chopra constituency forms the Darjeeling (Lok Sabha constituency). Islampur, Goalpokhar, Chakulia, Karandighi, Hemtabad, Kaliaganj and Raiganj constituencies forms the Raiganj (Lok Sabha constituency). Along with six assembly constituencies from South Dinajpur district, Itahar forms the Balurghat (Lok Sabha constituency).

=== Villages ===
- Baroduary
- Bindole
- Maharaja Hat

== Economy ==
In 2006 the Ministry of Panchayati Raj named Uttar Dinajpur one of the country's 250 most backward districts (out of a total of 640). It is one of the eleven districts in West Bengal currently receiving funds from the Backward Regions Grant Fund Programme (BRGF). but now Dalkhola the main commercial, business town with well-connected railway and roadways, increasing the economy of Dalkhola and Uttar Dinajpur District. Other important urban regions include Raiganj, Islampur and Kaliaganj.

== Tourism ==
In 1985, Uttar Dinajpur district became home to the Raiganj Wildlife Sanctuary, which has an area of 1.3 km^{2} (0.5 mi^{2}).

Other tourist places include:

- Swaminath Temple at Swaminath
- Rajbari at Rajbari Gate
- Shiv Mandir at Itahar
- Danhasori Pithasthal at Chandigram
- Shree Shree Ma Bhabani Devi Than at Bouaha
- Shidhi binayak Mandir at, Maharaja Hat
- Bhairobi Mandir at Bindole

== Transport ==
Major railway stations are Raiganj(RGJ), Radhikapur (RDP), Kaliyagunj, Dalkolha and Aluabari Road Jn (Islampur). Dalkolha is most important stoppage of long-distance train. NH 27 and NH 12 are two National Highways in this District. Radhikapur-Kolkata (RDP-KOAA) Express train and Radhikapur-Howrah Kulik Express (RDP-HWH) are the two direct train for Raiganj to South Bengal Communication. Although RDP-SGUJ DEMU is the only direct train for Raiganj to North Bengal Communication. NBSTC, SBSTC are transport corporations serving the area. Siliguri More is that point zone which connect four district zone North Dinajpur, South Dinajpur, North Bengal and South Bengal through High Ways.

== Education ==
As of 2012, there were 3282 schools in the Uttar Dinajpur district. 3100 of these are in rural areas, and 182 urban.

There is Raiganj University in Uttar Dinajpur situated at Raiganj.

Others general degree and diploma colleges are here also.

Some notable colleges such as:

- Chopra Kamala Paul Smriti Mahavidyalaya
- Dr. Meghnad Saha College
- Islampur College
- Islampur Government Polytechnic
- Kaliyaganj College
- Raiganj Government Medical College and Hospital
- Raiganj Polytechnic
- Raiganj Surendranath Mahavidyalaya
- Shree Agrasen Mahavidyalaya

== Notable people ==
- Abdul Karim Chowdhury - politician
- Mosaraf Hussen - politician
- Krishna Kalyani - politician, industrialist
- Md. Ghulam Rabbani - politician
- Hamidul Rahman - politician
- Soumen Roy - politician
- Tapan Deb Singha - politician
