= Raiganj =

City in West Bengal, India

- City
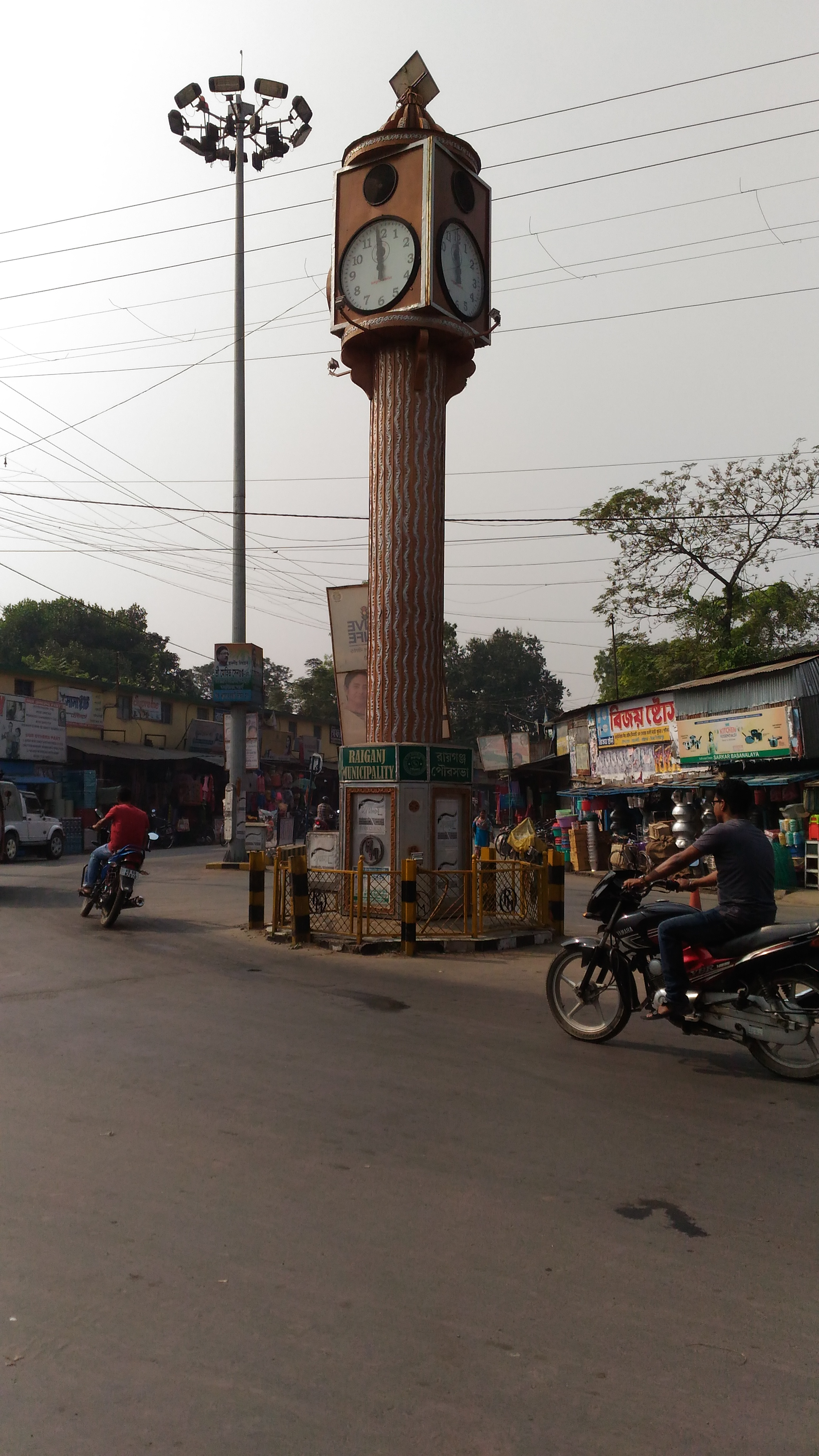
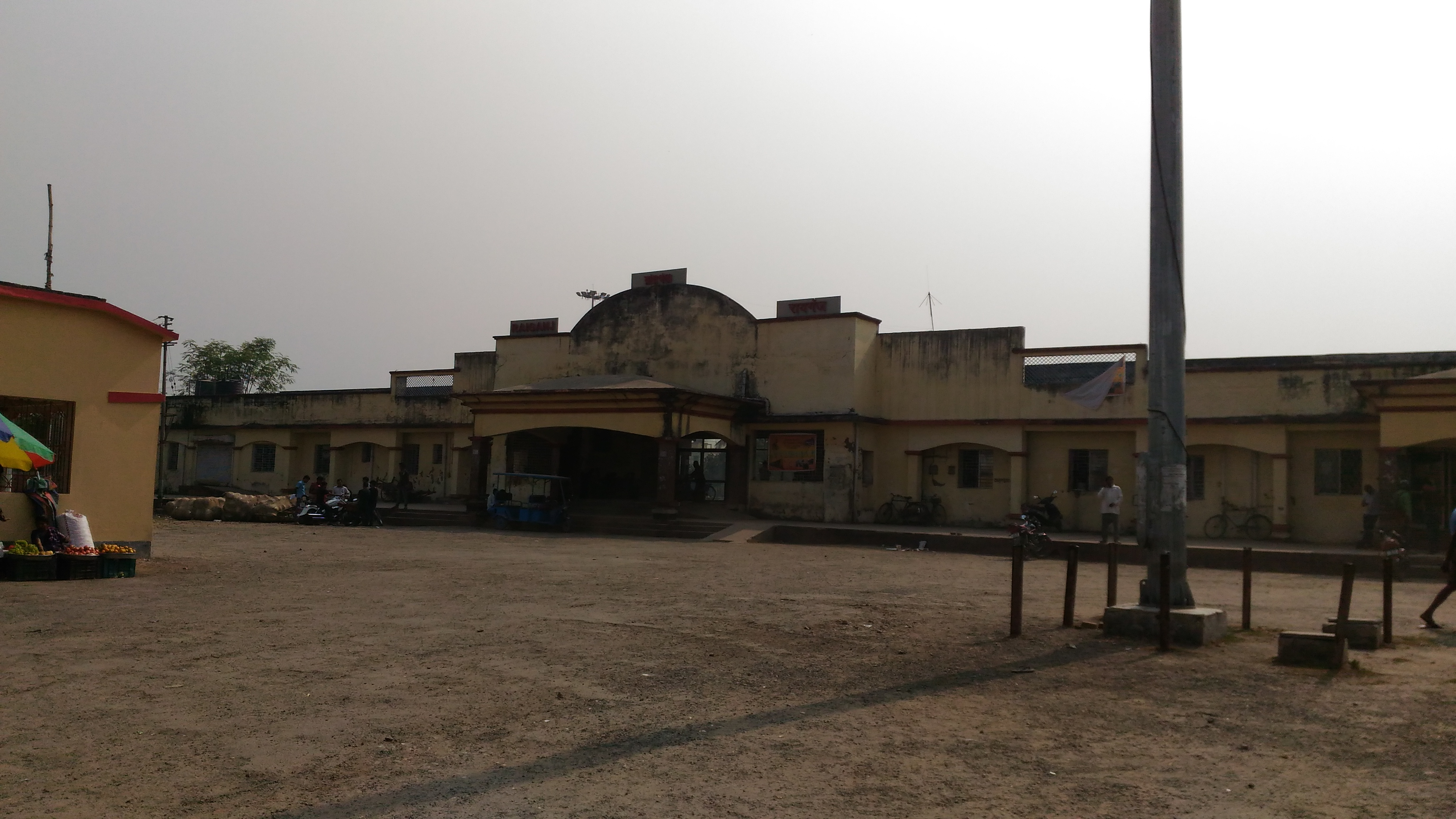
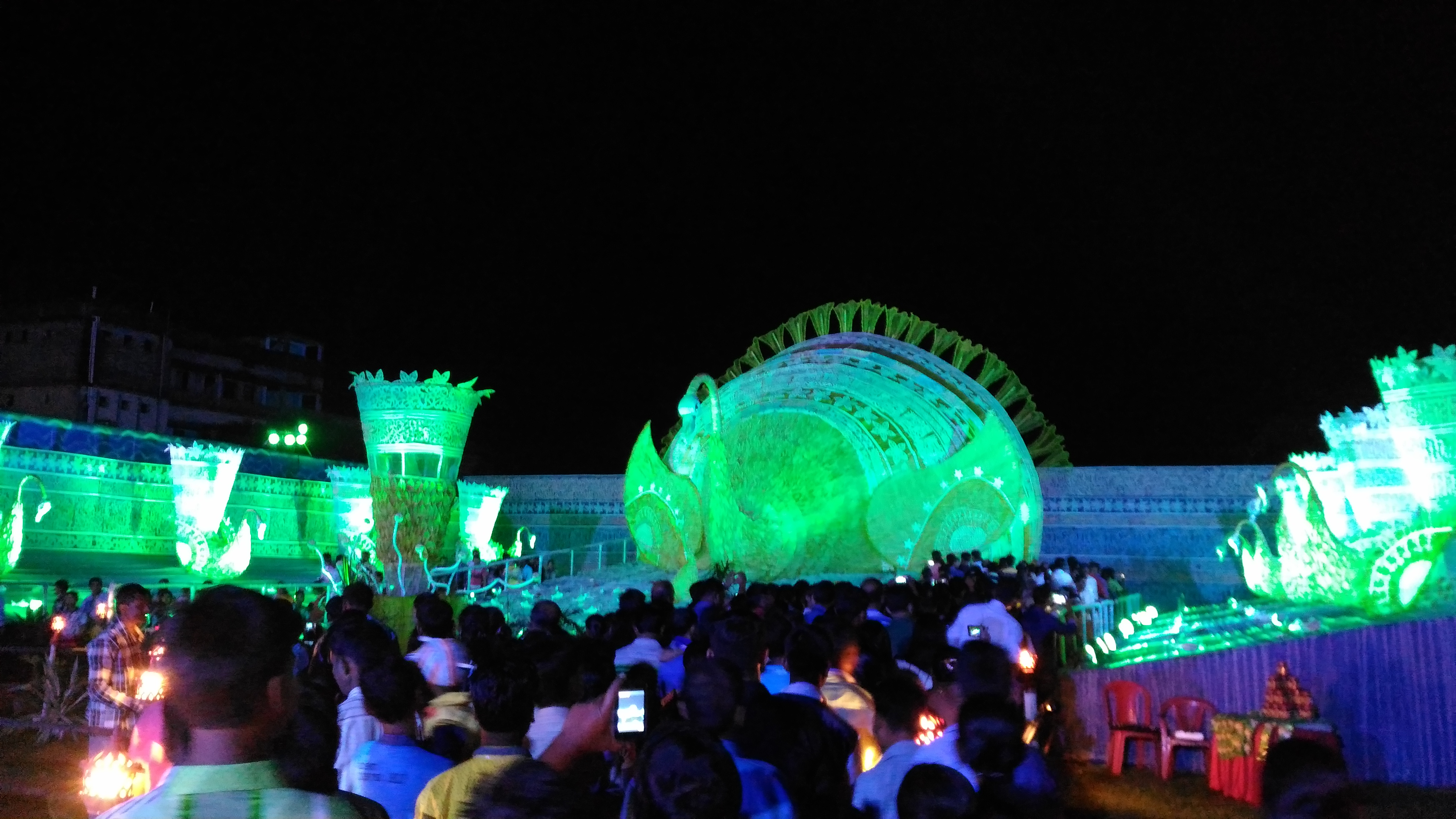
- From top: Clock Tower of Raiganj; Raiganj railway station Sudarshanpur Durga Puja

- Location in West Bengal, India Raiganj (India)
- Coordinates: 25.62°N 88.12°E
- Country: India
- State: West Bengal
- District: Uttar Dinajpur

Government
  - Type: Municipality
  - Body: Raiganj Municipality
  - Chairman: Sandip Bisawas (AITC)
  - Superintendent of Police: Sana Akhtar (IPS)
  - District Magistrate: Arvind Kumar Mina (IAS)
  - Member of Parliament: Kartick Chandra Paul (BJP)
  - MLA: Koushik Chowdhury (BJP)

Area
  - City: 10.76 km^{2} (4.15 sq mi)
- Elevation: 40 m (130 ft)

Population (2011)
  - City: 183,682
  - Density: 18,378/km^{2} (47,600/sq mi)
  - Metro: 199,758

Languages
  - Official: Bengali
  - Additional official: English
- Time zone: UTC+5:30 (IST)
- Postal codes: 733134,733130,733123
- Telephone code: 03523m
- Vehicle registration: WB-60/ WB-59
- Lok Sabha constituency: Raiganj
- Vidhan Sabha constituency: Raiganj
- Website: www.raiganjmunicipality.com

Raiganj (Bengali pronunciation: [rae̯ gɔnd͡ʒ]) is a city in the Indian state of West Bengal and it stands on the bank of the Kulik river. This city is the headquarters of the Uttar Dinajpur district. The city situated in the narrow strip which joins the northern and southern portion of the state of West Bengal, has come up in prominence as a result of partition of India.

== Etymology ==
The origin of the name "Raiganj" is not exactly known, and is debated. Some say the name is linked to the royal family of Dinajpur whose surname was Rai. The widely accepted view is that the name originated from the abundance of rai sorshe (a special type of mustard) crops at this place from time immemorial. Many people think that the word "Raiganj" came from "Rai" meaning "Radha", the consort of Krishna. In this connection, "Kaliaganj", nearest city to Raiganj, comes from "Kalia" meaning "Krishna", the central character of Mahabharata.

== Geography ==
Cities and towns in the Uttar Dinajpur district
M: municipal city/ town, CT: census town, R: rural/ urban centre, T: tourist centre
Owing to space constraints in the small map, the actual locations in a larger map may vary slightly.

=== Raiganj Wildlife Sanctuary ===
Raiganj is known for Raiganj Wildlife Sanctuary (also called the Kulik Bird Sanctuary), home to a large population of Asian openbills and other waterbirds and it is the largest bird sanctuary in Asia. Raiganj is situated at the banks of Kulik river which helped the town to become an important place for water connectivity. In course of time, the navigability of Kulik river decreased and business through the waterway was stopped in the first half of the 1970s, especially after the dam was erected to prevent floods. The port area slowly lost its significance and, at present, it is the most backward locality of Raiganj.

=== Location ===
The area of this town is about 36.51 km^{2}. The present growing tendency and trend of urbanisation in the area adjacent to this town are also remarkable. The agglomeration areas are also experiencing this trend. Now the vast areas under Birghai, Maraikura, Rupahar, Bahin, Karnojora, and Maharaja Hat are also growing with the population like the town of Raiganj, and this population is dependent on Raiganj town.

In the map alongside, all places marked on the map are linked in the full screen version.

=== Police stations ===
Raiganj police station has jurisdiction over Raiganj municipal area and Raignaj CD block and covers an area of 472.13 km^{2}. It has two town outposts – Mohanbati TOP and Bandor TOP. It has another outpost – Karanjora outpost and a police camp at Bhatun.

Raiganj Women police station is located at Raiganj.

=== CD block HQ ===
The headquarters of Raiganj CD block is at Raiganj city.

== Demographics ==
Religions in Raiganj
| Religion | Percent |
| Hindus | 97.37% |
| Muslims | 2.16% |
| Jains | 0.16% |
| Others† | 0.31% |
Distribution of religions †Includes Christians (0.13%), Sikhs (0.02%), Buddhists (0.05%)

In the 2011 census, Raiganj Urban Agglomeration had a population of 199,758, of whom 104,966 were males and 94,792 were females. The 0–6 years population was 22,028. Effective literacy rate for the 7+ population was 81.71 per cent.

As per provisional reports of Census India, the population of Raiganj in 2011 was 183,612, of whom male and female were 96,388 and 87,224 respectively. Although Raiganj city had a population of 183,612, its urban / metropolitan population was 199,690, of whom 104,733 were males and 94,957 were females.

Hinduism was the majority religion in Raiganj city with 97.37% followers. Islam was the second most popular, with approximately 2.16% following it. Christianity was followed by 0.13%, Jainism by 0.16%, Sikhism by 0.05% and Buddhism by 0.05%. Around 0.00% stated 'other religion', and approximately 0.11% stated 'no particular religion'.

As of 2001 India census, Raiganj had a population of 165,222. Males constituted 53% of the population and females 47%. Raiganj had an average literacy rate of 75%, higher than the national average of 59.5%: male literacy was 79%, and female literacy was 71%. In Raiganj, 11% of the population were under 6 years of age.

== Climate ==
Raiganj has a humid subtropical climate (Köppen Cwa). The average high temperature in July, the warmest month, is 39 °C (102 °F), and in January, the coldest month, 26 °C (79 °F). The average annual temperature is 24.9 °C (76.8 °F). On average, 1,430 millimetres (56 in) of rain falls per year, with most of it falling in the wet season months of June through September. The wettest month is July, with 348 millimetres (13.7 in) of precipitation on average; the driest month is December, with only 5 millimetres (0.20 in).

Climate data for Raiganj
| Month | Jan | Feb | Mar | Apr | May | Jun | Jul | Aug | Sep | Oct | Nov | Dec | Year |
|---|---|---|---|---|---|---|---|---|---|---|---|---|---|
| Mean daily maximum °C (°F) | 20.3 (68.5) | 26.5 (79.7) | 32.6 (90.7) | 37.7 (99.9) | 38.9 (102.0) | 36.7 (98.1) | 33.0 (91.4) | 32.4 (90.3) | 32.3 (90.1) | 31.5 (88.7) | 28.8 (83.8) | 24.7 (76.5) | 31.53 (88.75) |
| Mean daily minimum °C (°F) | 9.2 (48.6) | 11.6 (52.9) | 16.4 (61.5) | 22.3 (72.1) | 25.2 (77.4) | 26.7 (80.1) | 26.2 (79.2) | 26.1 (79.0) | 25.7 (78.3) | 21.8 (71.2) | 14.7 (58.5) | 9.9 (49.8) | 19.65 (67.37) |
| Average precipitation mm (inches) | 19 (0.7) | 11 (0.4) | 11 (0.4) | 8 (0.3) | 33 (1.3) | 134 (5.3) | 306 (12.0) | 274 (10.8) | 227 (8.9) | 94 (3.7) | 9 (0.4) | 4 (0.2) | 1,130 (44.5) |
Source: worldweather.org

== Transport ==
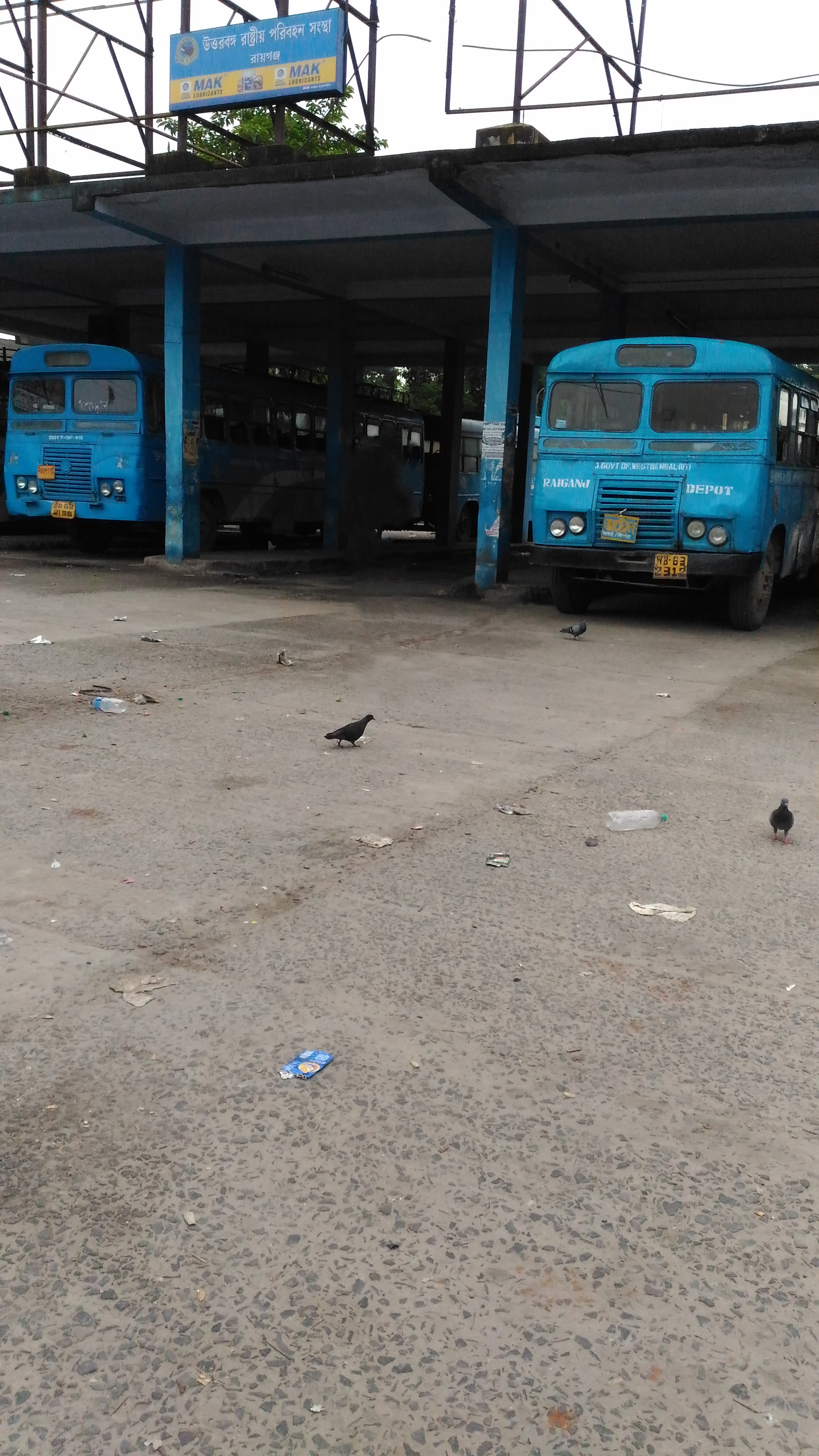
NBSTC, Raiganj

Rickshaws, auto-rickshaws, e-rickshaws and city autos are the most widely available public transport in Raiganj. Most residents stay within a few kilometres of the town centre and have their own vehicles, mostly motorcycles and bicycles.

Raiganj railway station is on the Barsoi-Radhikapur branch line. Railway connectivity reached here more than 150 years ago but, due to Indo-Bangladesh partition in 1971 the links through Bangladesh were lost and the railway became only a branch line.

NH 34 passes through Raiganj which connects is to the capital of the state Kolkata. Conversion of the highway to four lanes is going on and the proposed highway will bypass Raiganj by about 6 km. The roadway connectivity suffers due to the traffic jam caused at Dalkhola on a regular basis. Raiganj also lacks in railway connectivity because the station is on a branch line. In the 1960s, the broad gauge line was shifted to Malda-Barsoi-Dalkhola, thus bypassing Raiganj.

=== Roadways ===
Raiganj is connected by buses to a few major cities through NBSTC and private bus services. NH 12 and SH 10A are its lifelines. SH 10A connects it to Kaliaganj, Balurghat, Hili. Buses are available all day long to Balurghat, Siliguri, Jalpaiguri, Alipurduar, Coochbehar, Malda, Kolkata, Maharaja Hat and a few other important cities. Overnight bus facilities are available mostly to Kolkata and Dhubri.

=== Railways ===
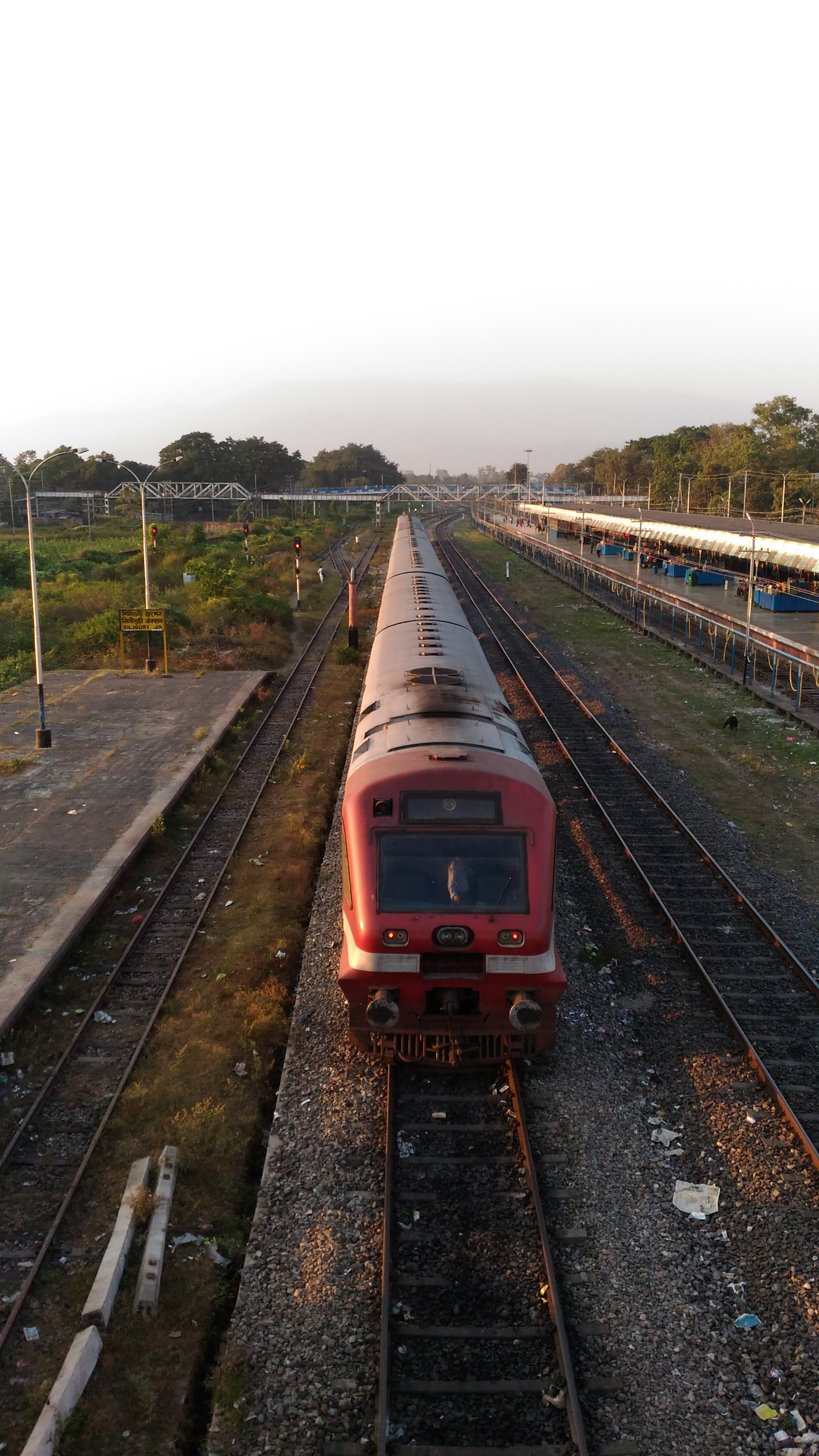
RDP-SGUJ DEMU at SGUJ

Raiganj railway station is on the Barsoi-Radhikapur branch line. One express train, Radhikapur Express, is available for reaching Kolkata, and a link superfast express train, Radhikapur-Anandvihar Express, was available for going to New Delhi. It was inaugurated in 2003. During the COVID pandemic, this was among several other trains that were stopped for preventing the spread of the pandemic. It is not functional yet though there are news of it starting soon. A couple of Katihar bound local passenger trains and a Siliguri bound DMU passenger can also be availed.

Mamata Banerjee during her tenure as the union railways minister announced railways projects for Raiganj which boosted the communication. The Radhikapur Howrah Kulik Express is also available in morning from Raiganj Railway station inaugurated by MP Debasree Chaudhuri.

- Raiganj-Dalkhola line (43.43 km)
- Raiganj-Itahar-Gazole line
- Kaliyaganj-Buniadpur line

=== Airways ===
Raiganj has no airport of its own. The government announced an airport in Raiganj named as Raiganj Airport.

The nearest operating airport is Bagdogra Airport near Siliguri, about 166 km from Raiganj. IndiGo and SpiceJet are the major carriers that connect the area to Delhi, Kolkata, Hyderabad, Guwahati, Mumbai, Chennai, Bangkok, Paro, Chandigarh and Balurghat airport.

== Notable sites ==
=== Raiganj Bird Sanctuary ===
Situated along the National Highway and by the side of the Kulik river is the Raiganj Wildlife Sanctuary with an area of 35 acres and a buffer area of 286 acres. The forest and water bodies attract migratory birds like the open bill stork, night heron, cormorant, little cormorant and egret from South Asian countries and coastal regions. Local birds like dove, bulbul, sparrow, kingfisher, woodpecker, owl, duck and cuckoo, can also be seen in large numbers.

The migratory birds arrive from the end of May to the first week of July, and depart from mid-December to the end of January. The nesting time is from July to August, and egg laying from August to September. The flying training to the young ones is the best time to observe the birds, around October to November. Every winter nearly 150 different bird species arrive here from the north in numbers ranging from 65,000 to 75,000.

The sanctuary has an artificial network of man made canals which is connected to the River Kulik. During the months of monsoon the flood water from the river enters the plains of the sanctuary. This acts as an important source of food for most of the bird species.

Legal status of the forest:

| Reserved Forest | 573.71 acres |
| Protected Forest | 249.50 acres |
| Unclassed Forest | 660.54 acres |
| Total | 1483.75 acres = 610.71 ha = 6.01 sq. km |

This bird sanctuary is set to be rejuvenated, with plans of developing a deer park and a tortoise park soon at the core of the sanctuary by the state government.

=== Raiganj Church ===
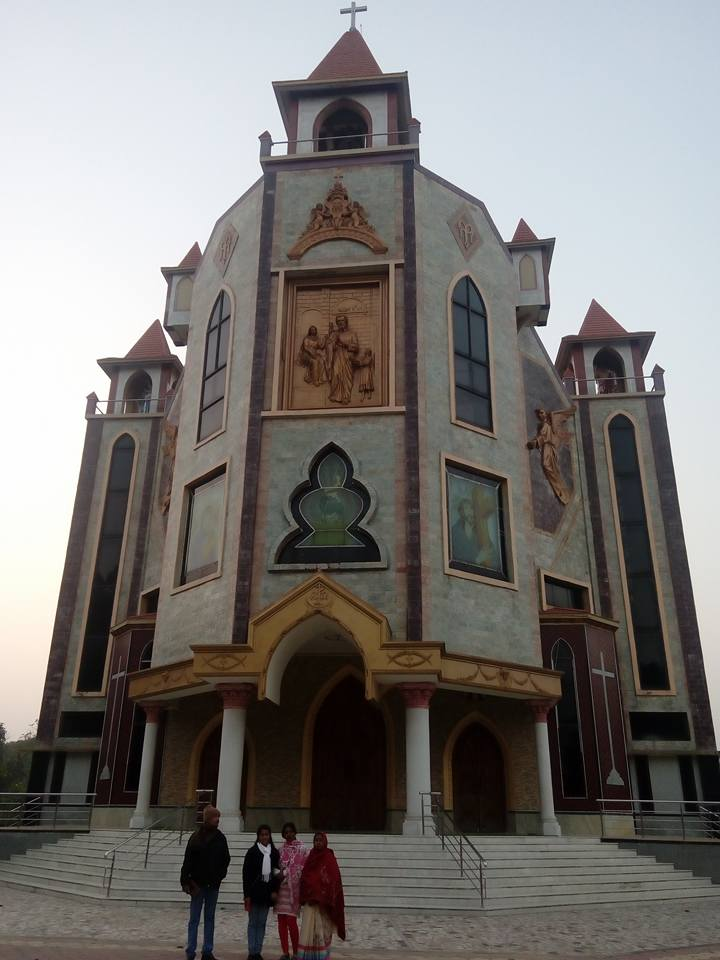
Raiganj Church

The Raiganj Church is dedicated to St. Joseph the Worker, the patron saint of Raiganj Diocese. The spacious building has glass and ceiling paintings, prominent pillars on both sides modelled on Greek pillars, carved doors and a high altar with an hexagonal dome on top of it.

=== Jain Temples ===
A very small minority of Raiganj's Population is Jain, according to the 2011 census only 0.16% of the population identified as following Jainism. Owing to their very small population, there isn't any significant Temples dedicated to Jainism in Raiganj. The famous Jain Temples of the Raiganj locality of Ayodhya are not related to this town and can be mistaken.

== Educational institutions ==
=== Schools ===
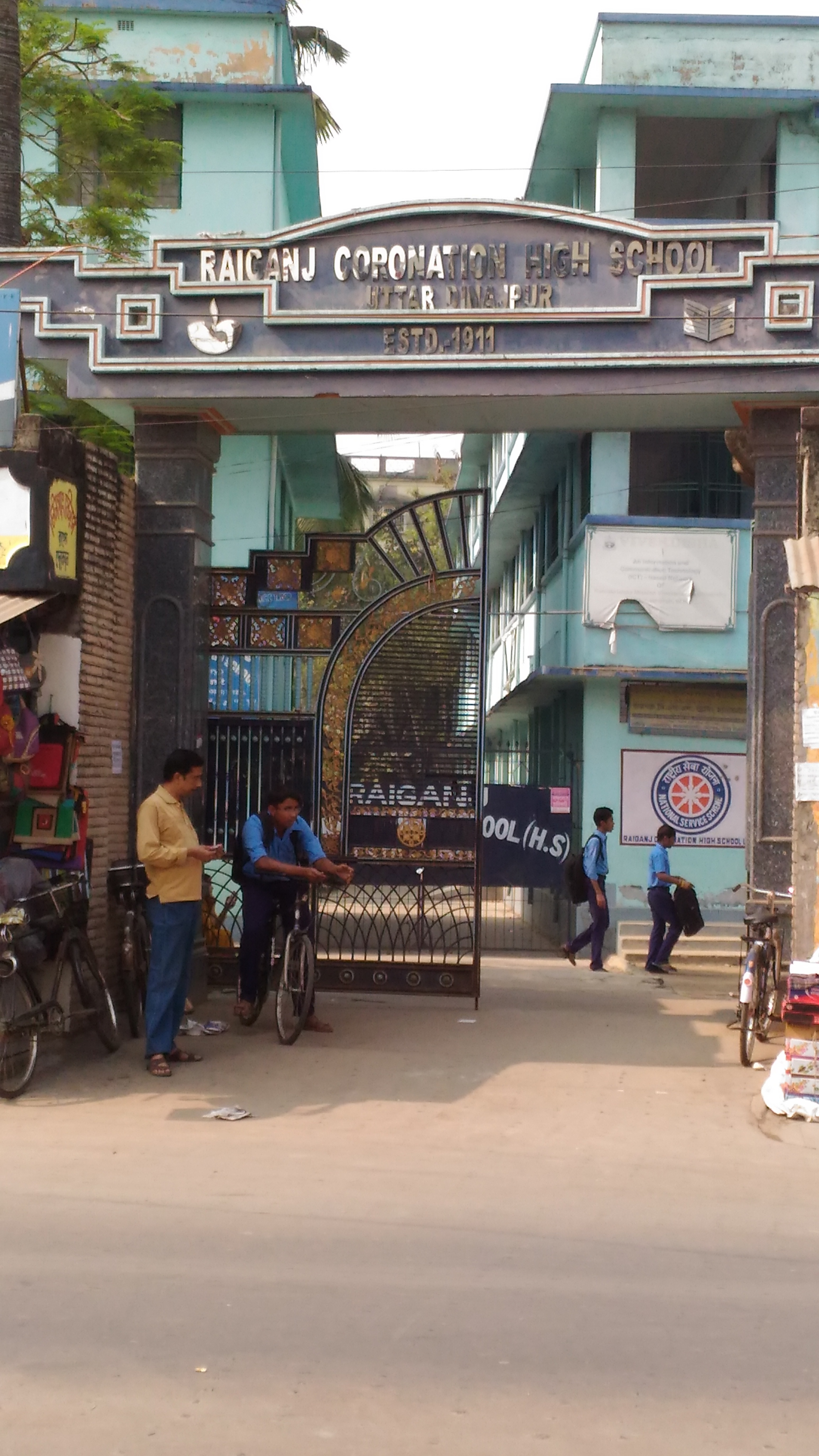
Raiganj Coronation High School

Raiganj's schools usually use English and Bengali as their medium of instruction, although the use of Hindi is also stressed. The schools are affiliated with the Indian Certificate of Secondary Education (ICSE) or the Central Board of Secondary Education (CBSE) or the West Bengal Board of Secondary Education. Schools include Raiganj Coronation High School, the oldest school in the town, established in 1911, and English medium ICSE High School St. Xaviers School.

=== Colleges ===
There are several colleges and a government polytechnic in the town. Raiganj College has been upgraded to Raiganj University, an autonomous, state-owned university. The colleges of Raiganj were affiliated to University of North Bengal, but after the establishment of University of Gour Banga at Malda in 2008, the colleges are now affiliated to University of Gour Banga. Notable colleges include Raiganj Surendranath Mahavidyalaya.

=== University ===
==== Raiganj University ====
Raiganj University is a public university in Raiganj, in the Uttar Dinajpur district. It offers undergraduate and postgraduate courses in arts, commerce and sciences. It became a university in August 2015. Earlier it was a university college, which was affiliated to the University of North Bengal. It also offers PhD programmes in humanities- and science-based subjects.

== Healthcare ==
As of 2016, the healthcare system in Raiganj consisted of a government super speciality hospital, under the Department of Health & Family Welfare, Government of West Bengal, and quite a few private medical establishments.

=== Raiganj Government Medical College and Hospital ===
The college and hospital were inaugurated in 2018. There are two campuses: Abdulghata campus and Dr. B.C Roy Street campus.

=== Raiganj District Hospital ===
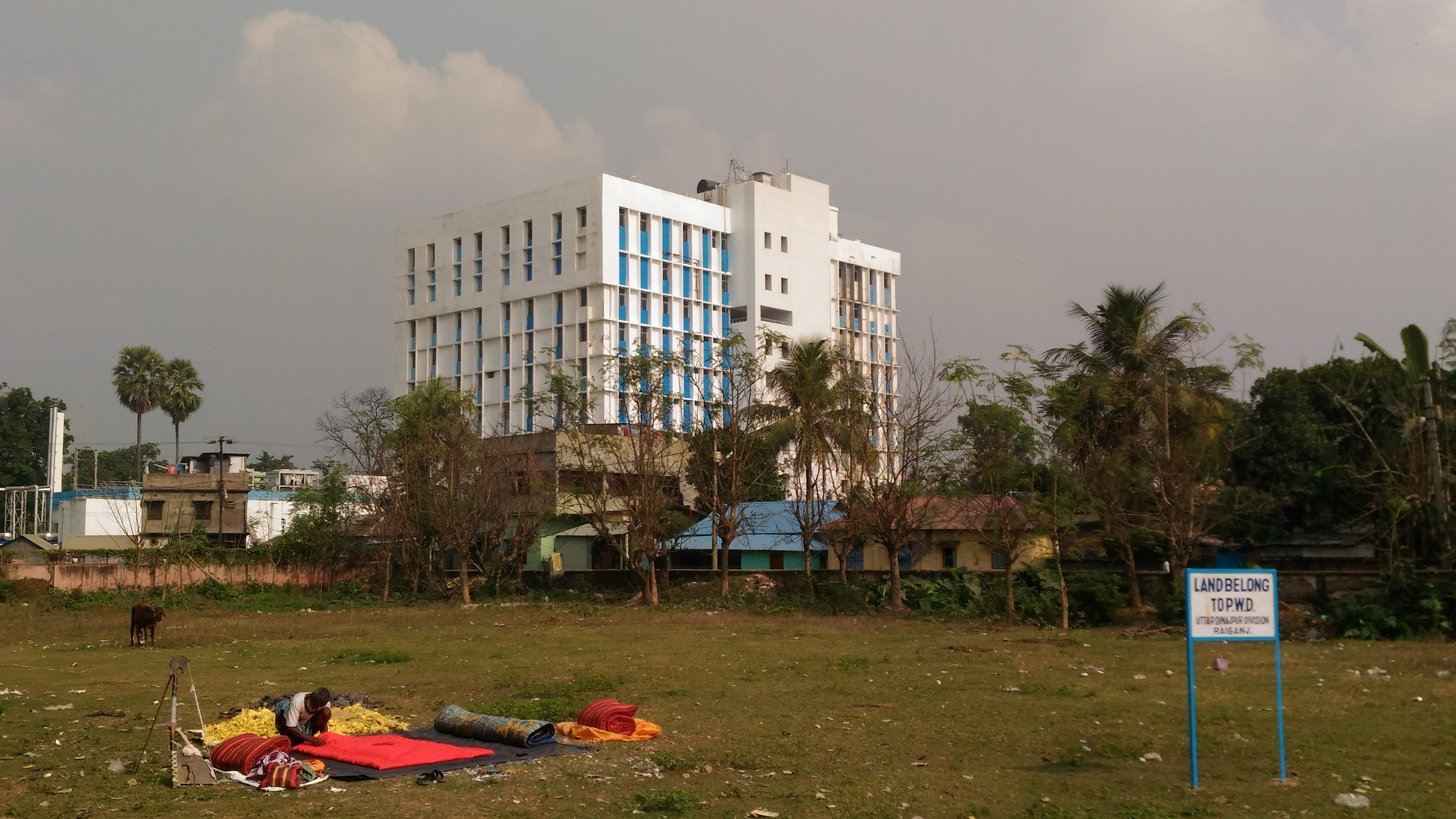
Raiganj Super Speciality Hospital

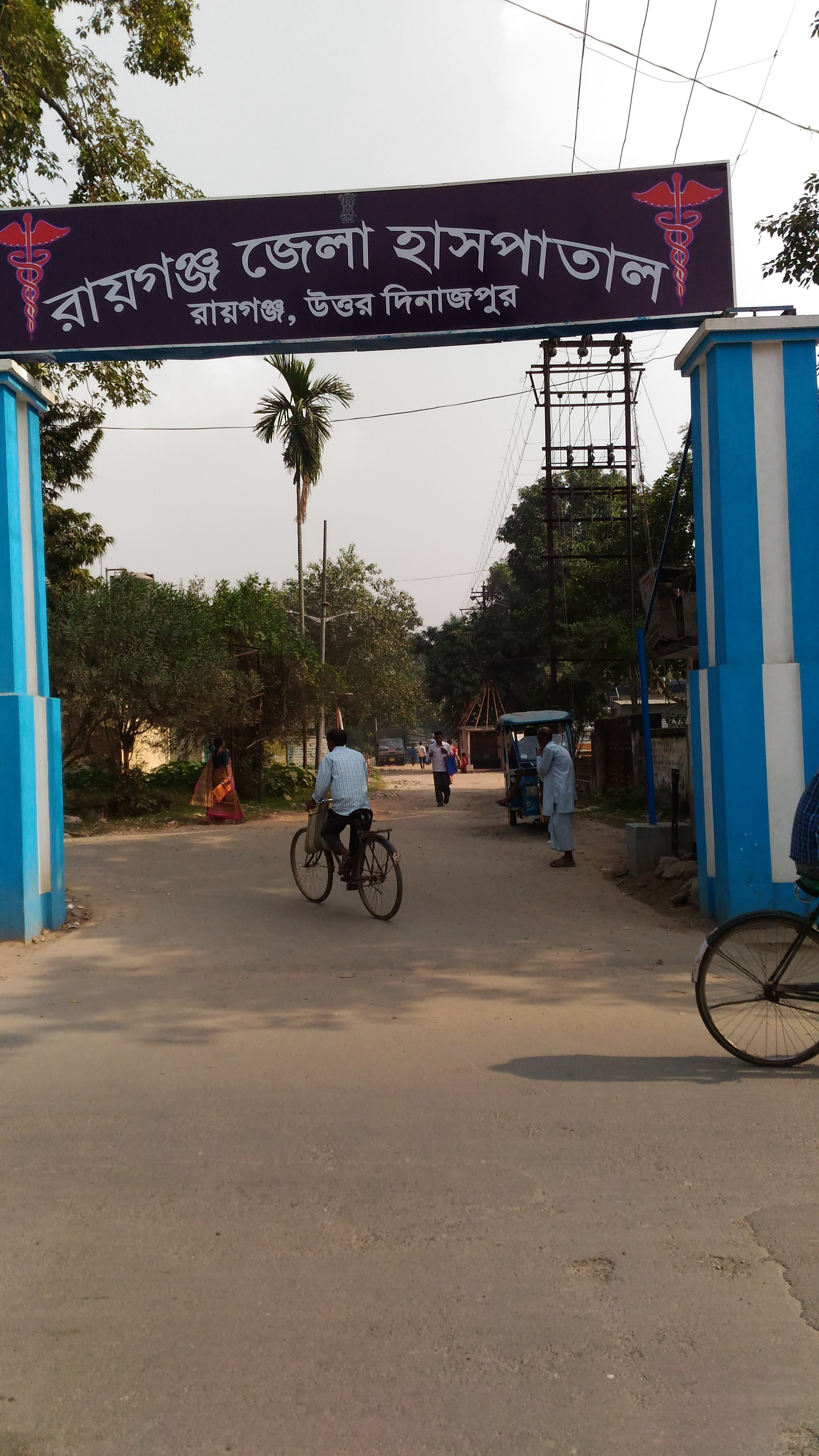
Raiganj Medical College & Hospital

There are a total of 400 existing beds for patients in different wards of Raiganj district hospital. However, there was no infrastructure for the treatment of dying patients and the patients who suffer from complicated diseases of the kidney and heart. Hence, on most occasions, complicated patients are transferred either to North Bengal Medical College & Hospital in Siliguri or Malda medical college and even to Kolkata which is 444 km away.

On 27 November, the state Chief Minister Mamata Banerjee during her visit to Raiganj announced that Raiganj District Hospital would be upgraded to a super specialty hospital and to start new Raiganj Medical College & Hospital in 2018.

== Economy ==
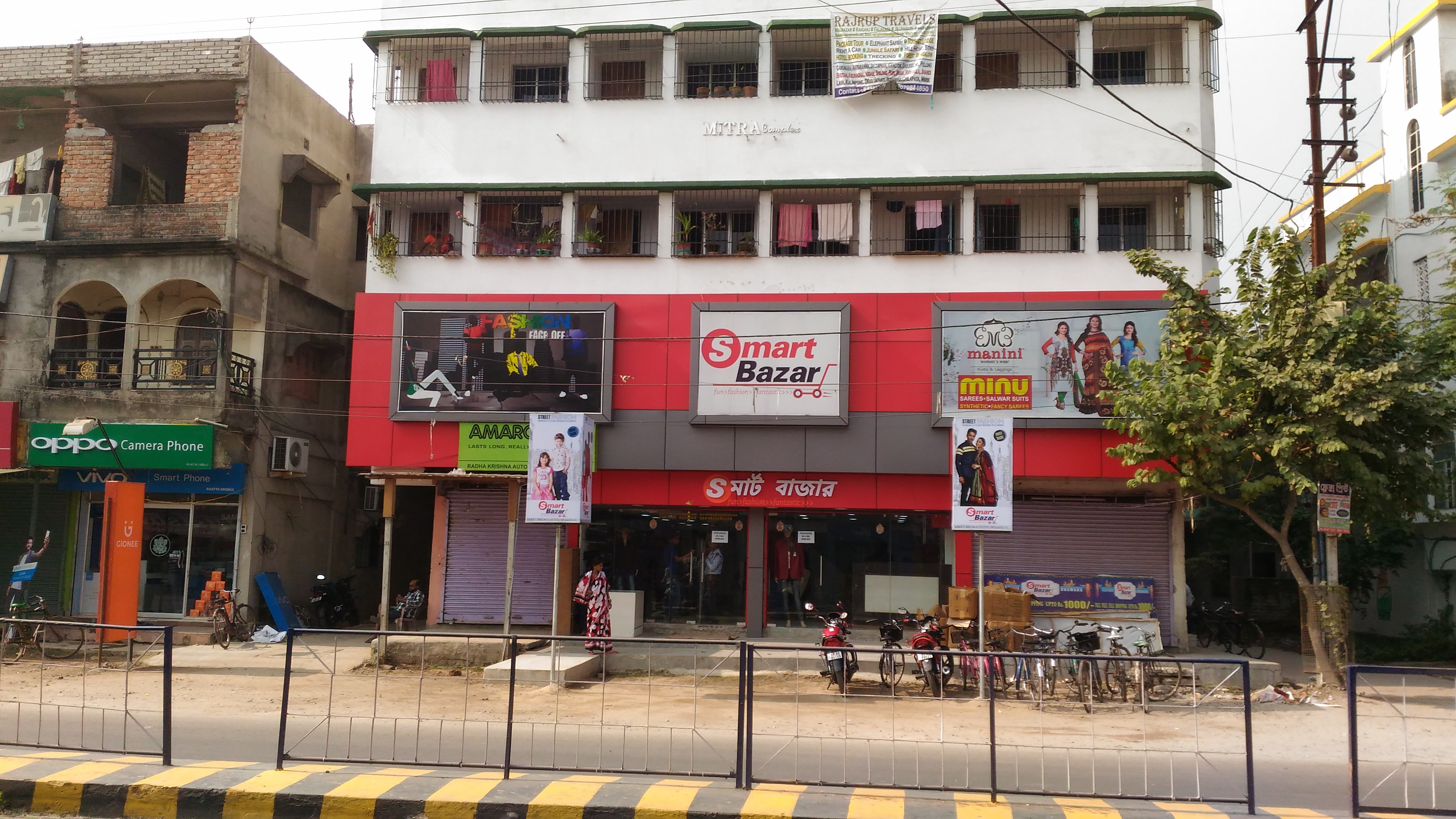
Smart Bazar, Raiganj

Raiganj remains an important trading centre, running daily business transaction of at least 60 thousand on average, next only to Siliguri. Around two lakh people visit Raiganj every day for business. However, there is no industry as such in Raiganj.

The economy of Raiganj also depends greatly on agriculture. Raiganj is the sole producer of an aromatic basmati rice called Tulaipanji. Tulaipanji rice has been given a Geographical Indication Tag from the Government of India, and was sent to the London Olympics in a promotional effort. One kind of brinjal is also produced at Raiganj which is much larger than its other species.

== Civic administration ==
There is Raiganj municipality. It is divided into 27 wards. Currently, the All India Trinamool Congress, which has elected most councillors, controls the municipal board. Sandip Biswas of the All India Trinamool Congress is the current chairperson of the ongoing board of administrators and Arindam Sarkar of the All India Trinamool Congress is the current vice-chairperson of the ongoing board of administrators.

Raiganj is the district headquarter of Uttar Dinajpur. The administrative buildings are located at Karnajora, a gram panchayat area five kilometres from Raiganj town. All along, Raiganj was developed in a scattered manner. When West Dinajpur existed, this side was deprived since the district headquarters was in Balurghat.

=== Raiganj Bhavan ===
On 23 March 2008, the Union I&B and Parliamentary affairs minister Priya Ranjan Dasmunsi inaugurated the newly constructed Raiganj Bhawan in Kolkata (Kasba area).

== Culture ==
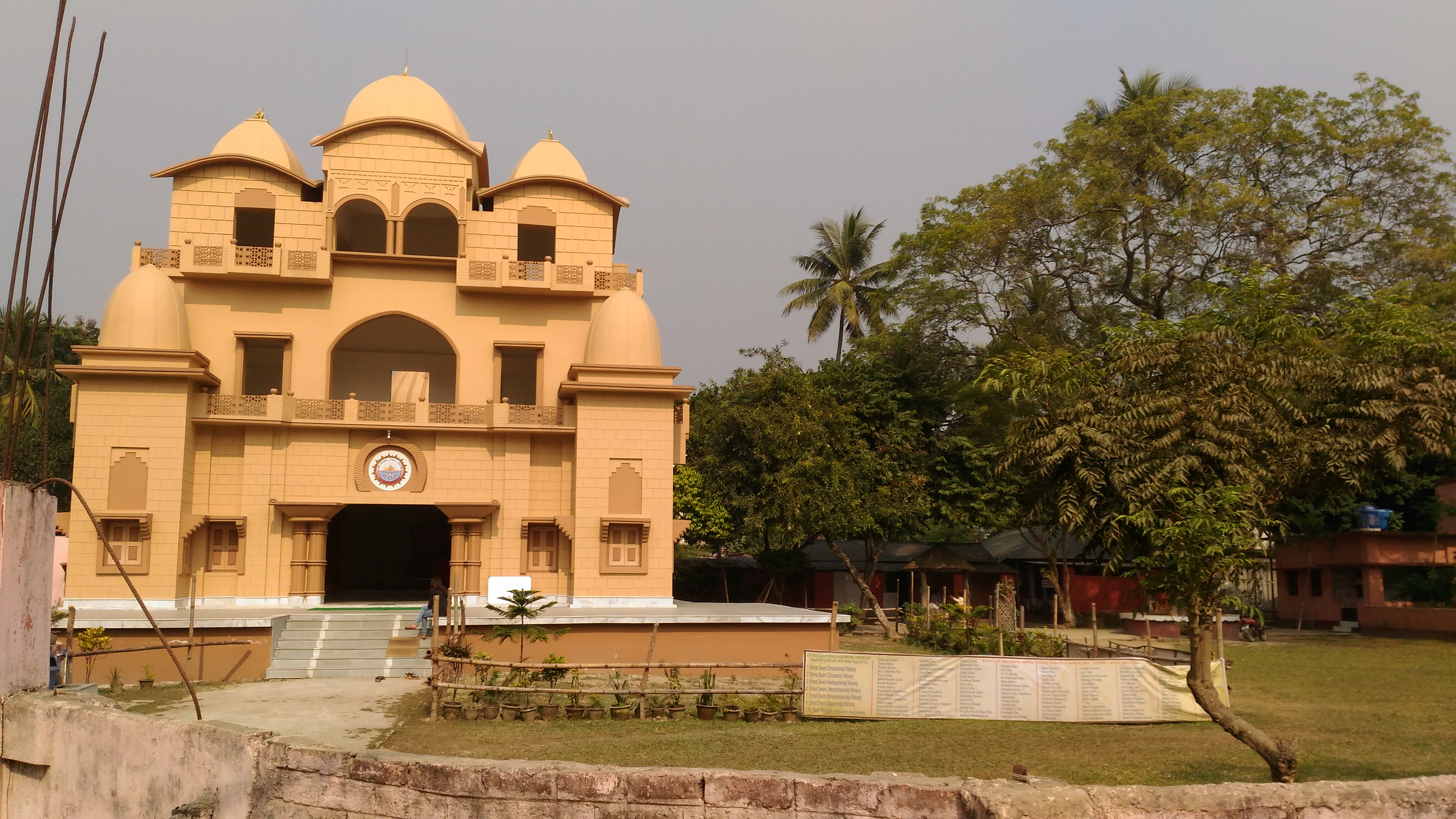
Raiganj Ram Krishna Mission (Branch of Belur Math)

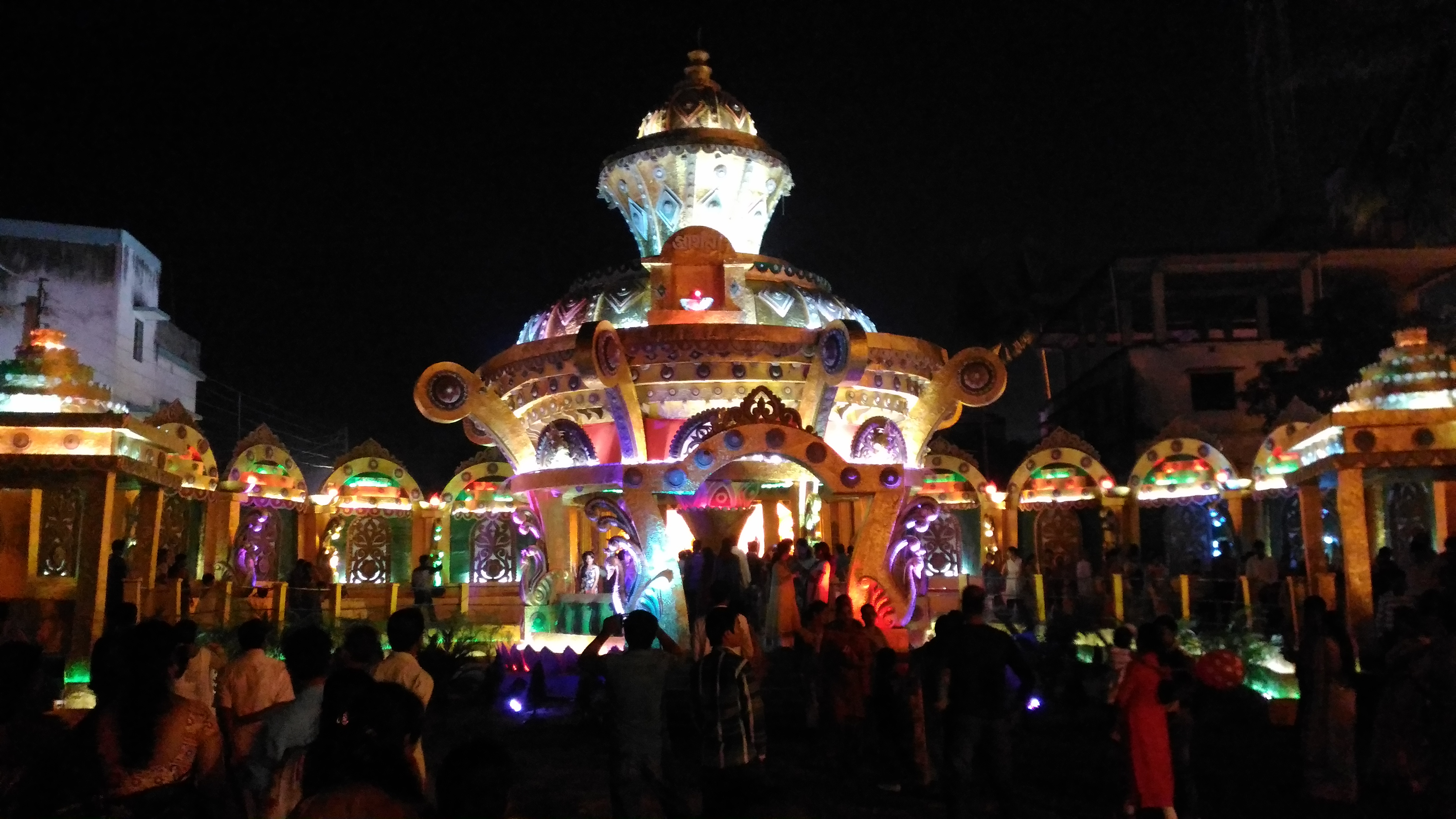
Kali Puja at Netaji Pathagar

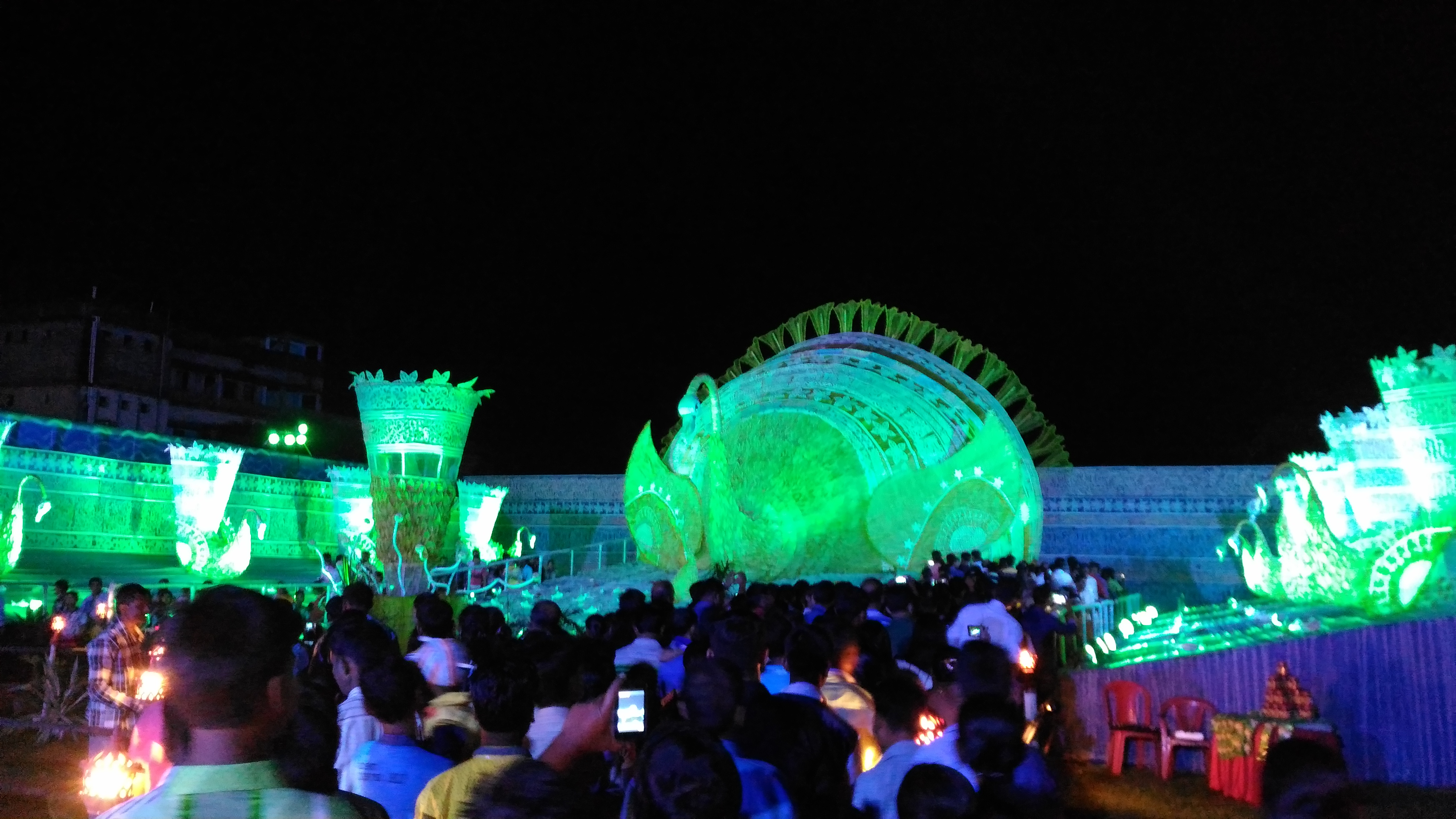
Sudarshanpur Durga Puja

- Local dances: Khan dance, Natua, Jang Gan, Mokha dance, Halna Halnani dances, Bhogta dances
- Handicrafts: terracotta and jute decorative articles

== Media ==
- Newspaper: Newspapers in Raiganj include English language dailies The Statesman and The Telegraph, which are printed in Siliguri, and The Hindustan Times and the Times of India, which are printed in Kolkata and received after a day's delay. In addition, Hindi and Bengali publications, including Sambad Pratidin, Anandabazar Patrika, Bartaman, Ganashakti, Uttar Banga Sambad, Ajkal, and Dainik Jagran, are available.
- Radio: The public station All India Radio is the only radio channel that can be received in Raiganj.

== Notable people ==
- Diptendu Pramanick
