= Islampur, Uttar Dinajpur (community development block) =

Islampur
- Community development block
- Interactive map of Islampur
- Coordinates: 26.27°N 88.20°E
- Country: India
- State: West Bengal
- District: Uttar Dinajpur

Area
  - Total: 329.44 km^{2} (127.20 sq mi)

Population (2011)
  - Total: 300,518
  - Density: 912.21/km^{2} (2,362.6/sq mi)

Languages
  - Official: Bengali, English, Urdu
- Time zone: UTC+5:30 (IST)
- Lok Sabha constituency: Raiganj
- Vidhan Sabha constituency: Islampur
- Website: uttardinajpur.nic.in

Islampur is a community development block that forms an administrative division in Islampur subdivision of Uttar Dinajpur district in the Indian state of West Bengal.

== History ==
Historically the western frontier of ancient Pundravardhana kingdom, bordering ancient Anga of Mahabharat fame, the Dinajpur area remained somewhat obscure in the major empires that held sway over the region and beyond till the rise of the Dinajpur Raj during the Mughal period. Some areas later forming a part of Uttar Dinajpur were parts of kingdoms in Nepal. Dinajpur district was constituted by the British in 1786, with a portion of the estate of Dinajpur Raj. Subsequent to the Permanent Settlement in 1793, the semi-independent Dinajpur Raj was further broken down and some of its tracts were transferred to the neighbouring British districts of Purnea, Malda, Rajshahi and Bogra. In 1947, the Radcliffe Line placed the Sadar and Thakurgaon subdivisions of Dinajpur district in East Pakistan. The Balurghat subdivision of Dinajpur district was reconstituted as West Dinajpur district in West Bengal. Raiganj subdivision was formed in 1948.

In order to restore territorial links between northern and southern parts of West Bengal which had been snapped during the partition of Bengal, and on the recommendations of the States Reorganisation Commission a portion of the erstwhile Kishanganj subdivision comprising Goalpokhar, Islampur and Chopra thanas (police stations) and parts of Thakurganj thana, along with the adjacent parts of the erstwhile Gopalpur thana in Katihar subdivision were transferred from Purnea district in Bihar to West Bengal in 1956, and were formally incorporated into Raiganj subdivision in West Dinajpur. The township of Kishanganj and its entire municipal boundary remained within Bihar.

Islampur subdivision was formed in March 1959. At the same time, the portion of Chopra PS lying to the north of the Mahananda river covering an area that now comprises Bidhannagar-1 gram panchayat, Bidhannagar-2 GP, Chathat-Bansgaon GP and the southern half of Phansidewa-Bansgaon Kismat GP in Darjeeling district, was transferred from West Dinajpur to the jurisdiction of Phansidewa PS in Darjeling district. With the introduction of the Community Development Programme in 1960–61, community development blocks were set up in West Dinajpur district.

In 1992, West Dinajpur district was bifurcated and Uttar Dinajpur district was established.

== Geography ==
Islampur is located at 26°16′N 88°12′E.

Uttar Dinajpur district has a flat topography and slopes gently from north to south. All rivers flow in that direction. Except for the eastern fringes of Chopra CD Block, most of the district is a part of the catchment area of the Mahanada and also a part of the larger Barind Tract The soil is composed of different varieties of alluvium. The main rivers are: Nagar, Mahananda, Kulik, Gamari, Chhiramati (Srimati) and Tangon. The rivers have little water in the dry season but with heavy rains, during monsoon, overflow the banks. The Nagar river flows along the international border with Bangladesh on the east of Islampur CD Block. The Sanauna, Dalaucha and Raba rivers flow through Islampur CD Block.

Islampur CD Block is bounded by Potha CD Block in Kishanganj district of Bihar and Chopra CD Block on the north, Atwari Upazila of Panchagarh District of Bangladesh and Baliadangi Upazila of Thakurgaon District of Bangladesh on the east, Goalpokhar I CD Block on the south and Kishanganj CD Block in Kishanganj district of Bihar on the west.

Approximately 206 km of the India-Bangladesh border is in Uttar Dinajpur district. It covers the eastern boundary of the district. On the western side Uttar Dinajpur district has 227 km boundary with Bihar.

Islampur CD Block has an area of 329.44 km^{2}.It has 1 panchayat samity, 13 gram panchayats, 178 gram sansads (village councils), 101 mouzas and 101 inhabited villages. Islampur police station serves this block. Headquarters of this CD Block is at Islampur.

Uttar Dinajpur district is one of the smaller districts in the state and stands 15th in terms of area (3,140.00 km^{2}) in the state.

Gram panchayats of Islampur block/ panchayat samiti are: Agdimti-Khanti, Gaisal I, Gaisal II, Gobindapur, Gunjaria, Islampur, Kamalagaon-Sujali, Matukunda I, Matikunda II, Panditpota I, Panditpota II, Ramganj I and Ramganj II.

== Demographics ==
=== Population ===
As per the 2011 Census of India, Islampur CD Block had a total population of 308,518, all of which were rural. There were 158,933 (52%) males and 149,586 (48%) females. Population below 6 years was 57,788. Scheduled Castes numbered 52,418 (16.99%) and Scheduled Tribes numbered 8,032 (2.60%).

As per 2001 census, Islampur block had a total population of 241,910, out of which 124,368 were males and 117,542 were females. Islampur block registered a population growth of 30.70 per cent during the 1991-2001 decade. Decadal growth for the district was 28.72 per cent

Large villages (with 4,000+ population) in Islampur CD Block were (2011 population in brackets): Phulhara (11,113), Ramganj (4,660), Kamlagaon (4,316), Purbba Gomaidighi (11,982), Kuchila (9,549), Dohaso (13,323), Barakhanti (9,617), Agdimti (5,168), Bhojpur (11,055), Panchdimti (9,337), Matikunda (4,529), Phulbari (5,134), Durgapur (4,674), Jagatagaon (6,671), Khabargaon (5,148), Chaprajhar (7,773), Aliganj (4,940), Paschim Pachurasia (7,318), Gunjaria (4,470), Dhantola (9,503), Gaisal (5,954), Kachna (4,809), Birnakundi (6,114), Bhelagachhi (4,528) and Gunabari (11,538).

Other villages in Islampur CD Block included (2011 population in brackets): Gobindapur (1,110) and Panditpota (3,898).

Decadal Population Growth Rate (%)

Note: The CD Block data for 1971–1981, 1981-1991 and 1991-2001 is for Islampur PS covering the block

The decadal growth of population in Islampur CD Block in 2001-2011 was 27.51%. The decadal growth of population in Islampur PS in 1991-2001 was 27.94%, in 1981-91 was 34.08% and in 1971-81 was 28.24%. The decadal growth rate of population in Uttar Dinajpur district was as follows: 30.2% in 1971–81, 34.0% in 1981–91, 28.7% in 1991-2001 and 23.2% in 2001–11. The decadal growth rate for West Bengal was 13.93% in 2001–2011, 17.77% in 1991–2001. 24.73% in 1981-1991 and 23.17% in 1971–1981.

Uttar Dinajpur district has the highest decadal population growth rate in West Bengal with a figure of 23.2% for the decade 2001-2011 and is much higher than the state average of 13.8%.

According to the Human Development Report for Uttar Dinajpur district, population growth in the area that later became Uttar Dinajpur district was low in the pre-independence era and started picking up with the waves of East Bengali refugees coming in from erstwhile East Pakistan. Despite the formation of an international border in 1947, none of the PS areas in the area which later formed Islampur SD showed much increase in settlement density between 1941 and 1951, and accelerated settlement only came into evidence in this region after 1961, following their transfer from Bihar to West Bengal. Thus, as population growth in the Uttar Dinajpur region accelerated considerably under the impetus of partition migration after 1951, the Islampur SD areas offered additional living space, easing the overall migration pressure on the region.

The Human Development Report analyses, “A spurt in population growth rates first became evident between 1951-1961, and was further magnified between 1971-81 after the creation of Bangladesh when population growth in most districts bordering the Bangladesh-West Bengal frontier showed similar escalation. However, after 1981, when population growth in most other West Bengal districts had tapered off, growth rates in Uttar Dinajpur again showed a fresh spurt. Thus, no deceleration in population growth rates occurred in the district until after 1991… In addition to Hindu and tribal migrants from across the international border, a sizeable number of migrant Muslims have also settled in the district, mainly driven by economic reasons… migrants from other states comprised 23% of the total migrants residing in Uttar Dinajpur.” The large number of migrants from other states is mainly from the neighbouring areas in Bihar.

A study by North Bengal University has observed that “Immigrants from East Pakistan/Bangladesh have arrived in Uttar Dinajpur in almost equal numbers before and after 1971.” The Human Development Report opines, “The overall post-Partition impact on the rates of demographic growth has been particularly strong in all North Bengal districts. Despite its smaller relative size, the region has received more migration in pro rata terms than the West Bengal districts lying south of the Ganga.”

=== Literacy ===
As per the 2011 census, the total number of literates in Islampur CD Block was 134,218 (53.53% of the population over 6 years) out of which males numbered 79,197 (61.14% of the male population over 6 years) and females numbered 55,021 (45.41% of the female population over 6 years). The gender disparity (the difference between female and male literacy rates) was 15.73%.

The literacy rate in Uttar Dinajpur district at 60.13% in 2011, up from 47.89% in 2001, was the lowest amongst all districts of West Bengal. The highest literacy rate amongst the districts of West Bengal was that of Purba Medinipur district at 87.66% in 2011.

According to the Human Development Report for Uttar Dinajpur district, “Goalpokhar-1, Goalpokhar-2, Karandighi and Islampur blocks in that order stood at the very bottom of the literacy scale in the state. This pooling of illiteracy within Islampur SD also led to the low ranking of Uttar Dinajpur at 494th position out of 595 Indian districts in terms of literacy rates in 2001, despite which its rank had improved considerably in relative terms from the 523rd rank it had occupied in 1991.”

The five blocks transferred from the state of Bihar to form a new subdivision in West Dinajpur in 1959 had until 1956 been part of the Kishanganj region which is still characterised by a low overall literacy rate of 31 percent in 2006–07, against which the corresponding rate for Uttar Dinajpur as a whole is a literacy rate of 48 percent... "Like Kishanganj which is now a full-fledged Bihar district, Islampur SD too has a largely rural profile, a large Muslim population and deep concentration of rural poverty"... Persisting regional disparities in access to education and infrastructure, rather than the response and enthusiasm of the local people are largely responsible for making Uttar Dinajpur the least literate district in West Bengal. "Thus, a major challenge facing the district relates to the improvement of educational attainments of the weaker social sections and women, especially among the Muslim community which has a dominant presence in the Islampur SD region… A huge gulf separates the Muslim literacy rate of 36 percent in Uttar Dinajpur from the Muslim literacy rate of 58 percent achieved by West Bengal as a whole."

See also – List of West Bengal districts ranked by literacy rate

See also - Literacy in Bihar

Literacy in CD blocks of
Uttar Dinajpur district
Raiganj subdivision
Raiganj – 63.52%
Hemtabad – 67.88%
Kaliaganj – 66.50%
Itahar – 58.95%
Islampur subdivision
Chopra – 59.90%
Islampur – 53.53%
Goalpokhar I – 42.26%
Goalpokhar II – 46.07%
Karandighi – 53.42%
Source: 2011 Census: CD Block Wise
Primary Census Abstract Data

=== Language and religion ===
Religion in Islampur CD Block (2011)
Islam	72.13%
Hinduism	27.56%
Other or not stated	0.31%

In the 2011 census, Muslims numbered 225,448 and formed 72.13% of the population in Islampur CD Block. Hindus numbered 85,039 and formed 27.56% of the population. Christians numbered 781 and formed 0.25% of the population. Others numbered 150 and formed 0.06% of the population. In Islampur CD Block, as per the District Statistical Handbook for Uttar Dinajpur, while the proportion of Muslims increased from 68.93% in 1991 to 71.08% in 2001, the proportion of Hindus declined from 30.84% in 1991 to 28.69% in 2001.

Languages of Islampur CD block (2011)
1. Surjapuri (57.3%)
2. Bengali (29.8%)
3. Urdu (8.44%)
4. Santali (2.47%)
5. Hindi (1.16%)
6. Others (0.84%)

At the time of the 2011 census, 57.31% of the population spoke Surjapuri, 29.78% Bengali, 8.44% Urdu, 2.47% Santali and 1.16% Hindi as their first language.

The Human Development Report for Uttar Dinajpur describes the Islampur subdivision as “a region where Urdu and Hindi are widely spoken as a first language because of the prior transfer of this territory to West Bengal from Bihar”

As per the West Bengal Official Language (Amendment) Act, 2012, which came into force from December 2012, Urdu was given the status of official language in areas, such as subdivisions and blocks, having more than 10% Urdu speaking population. In Uttar Dinajpur district, Goalpokhar I and II blocks, Islampur block and Islampur municipality were identified as fulfilling the norms set In 2014, Calcutta High Court, in an order, included Dalkhola municipality in the list.

== Rural poverty ==
As per the Rural Household Survey conducted in 2002, 40.7% of the rural families in Islampur CD Block belonged to the BPL category, against 46.7% of rural families in Uttar Dinajpur district being in the BPL category. As per the Human Development Report for Uttar Dinajpur district, Islampur and Karandighi rank sixth and seventh in terms of human development, with respective Human Development Index (HDIs) that indicate the existence of a wide human development gap between them and the lowest ranked Raiganj SD block of Itahar. However, in terms of the concentration of human poverty, they occupy a more favourable position than Itahar.

== Economy ==
=== Livelihood ===
Livelihood
in Islampur CD Block
1. Cultivators (29.4%)
2. Agricultural labourers (40.6%)
3. Household industries (1.15%)
4. Other Workers (28.9%)

In Islampur CD Block in 2011, amongst the class of total workers, cultivators numbered 27,957 and formed 29.36%, agricultural labourers numbered 38,639 and formed 40.57%, household industry workers numbered 1,099 and formed 1.15% and other workers numbered 27,535 and formed 28.91%. Total workers numbered 95,230 and formed 30.87% of the total population, and non-workers numbered 213,288 and formed 69.13% of the population.

Note: In the census records a person is considered a cultivator, if the person is engaged in cultivation/ supervision of land owned by self/government/institution. When a person who works on another person's land for wages in cash or kind or share, is regarded as an agricultural labourer. Household industry is defined as an industry conducted by one or more members of the family within the household or village, and one that does not qualify for registration as a factory under the Factories Act. Other workers are persons engaged in some economic activity other than cultivators, agricultural labourers and household workers. It includes factory, mining, plantation, transport and office workers, those engaged in business and commerce, teachers, entertainment artistes and so on.

=== Infrastructure ===
There are 101 inhabited villages in Islampur CD Block. All 101 villages (100%) have power supply. All 101 villages (100%) have drinking water supply. 17 villages (16.83%) have post offices. 90 villages (89.11%) have telephones (including landlines, public call offices and mobile phones). 42 villages (41.58%) have a pucca (paved) approach road and 20 villages (19.80%) have transport communication (includes bus service, rail facility and navigable waterways). 1 village (0.99%) has an agricultural credit society. 11 villages (10.89%) have banks.

=== Agriculture ===
“With its distinctive physiographic and agroclimatic features, the Dinajpur region has been a bread-basket area of Bengal for many centuries, growing multiple varieties of fine and coarse rice in vast quantities, along with major economic crops like jute. The livelihood profile of Uttar Dinajpur district has evolved in association with these old agricultural patterns, and more than two-thirds of its active workforce still draws livelihoods directly from agriculture and related occupations.”

Agricultural potential has been uneven across Uttar Dinajpur based on soil conditions and irrigation potential. This has generated considerable internal migration within the district, as areas with higher agricultural potential and higher labour demand has attracted large number of people. The impact of land reforms has also varied. As the Islampur subdivision blocks evolved initially under the Bihar administration, the land estates were larger in size and the extent of land acquired under ceiling laws were higher. The cultivator population in Islampur subdivision was also thinner. Such conditions have been favourable for migrants. The movement of people from agricultural activities to non-agricultural activities has been low in Uttar Dinajpur district except for some pockets.

Islampur CD Block had 139 fertiliser depots, 9 seed stores and 63 fair price shops in 2013–14.

In 2013–14, Islampur CD Block produced 32,426 tonnes of Aman paddy, the main winter crop from 15,784 hectares, 4,753 tonnes of Boro paddy (spring crop) from 1,917 hectares, 7,072 tonnes of wheat from 3,748 hectares, 3,019 tonnes of maize from 1,240 hectares, 58,719 tonnes of jute from 4,566 hectares and 96,453 tonnes of potatoes from 2,730 hectares. It also produced maskalai and oilseeds.

In 2013–14, the total area irrigated in Islampur CD Block was 742 hectares, out of which 450 hectares were irrigated by canal water, 12 hectares by river lift irrigation and 280 hectares by deep tube wells.

=== Craft based activities ===
“More than eleven hundred rural households across the district are engaged in traditional crafts based industries, among which dhokra, mat making, terracotta, village pottery and bamboo craft in the Goalpokhar-1 and Kaliaganj regions are notable.”

=== Banking ===
In 2012–13, Islampur CD Block had offices of 5 commercial banks and 2 gramin banks.

=== Backward Regions Grant Fund ===
Uttar Dinajpur district is listed as a backward region and receives financial support from the Backward Regions Grant Fund. The fund, created by the Government of India, is designed to redress regional imbalances in development. As of 2012, 272 districts across the country were listed under this scheme. The list includes 11 districts of West Bengal.

== Transport ==
Islampur CD Block has 4 ferry services and 10 originating/ terminating bus routes.

The Howrah–New Jalpaiguri line passes through Islampur CD Block and there are stations – Aluabari Road Junction, Gunjaria and Gaisal. In the early 1960s, when Farakka Barrage was being constructed, a far reaching change was made. Indian Railways constructed a new broad-gauge rail link from south Bengal to connect North Bengal.

National Highway 27 passes through Islampur town and Islampur CD Block.

== Education ==
In 2012–13, Islampur CD Block had 158 primary schools with 35,983 students, 12 middle schools with 2,449 students, 6 high schools with 4,974 students and 18 higher secondary schools with 12,933 students. Islampur CD Block had 1 technical/ professional institution with 47 students and 539 institutions for special and non-formal education with 42,719 students. There is a general degree college in the Islampur municipal area with 6,911 students, outside the CD Block.

As per the 2011 census, in Islampur CD Block, amongst the 101 inhabited villages, 4 villages did not have a school, 59 villages had 1 or more primary schools, 38 villages had at least 1 primary and 1 middle school and 19 villages had at least 1 middle and 1 secondary school.

The mid-day meal programme for rural school children was launched in 2005 in Uttar Dinajpur district. As on 30 April 2015, 602,557 children in 3,006 schools were covered under this programme.

Islampur College was established in 1973 at Islampur (outside the CD block).

=== Schools ===
- Ramganj High School at Ramganj – coeducational higher secondary school
- Bhadrakali High School at Gobindapur – coeducational higher secondary school
- Darivit High School at Panditpota – coeducational higher secondary school
- Jagtagaon High School at Matikunda – coeducational higher secondary school
- Matikunda High School at Matikunda – coeducational higher secondary school
- Pachhu Rasia High School at Gunjaria – coeducational higher secondary school
- Patagora High School at Agdimti-Khanti – coeducational higher secondary school
- Shyama Prasad S. Balika Vidyalaya at Ramganj – girls only higher secondary school
- Srikrishnapur High School at Matikunda – coeducational higher secondary school
- Fazlul Haq N.S. High Madrasah at Agdimti-Khanti - coeducational higher secondary school

== Healthcare ==
In 2013, Islampur CD Block had 1 block primary health centre and 1 primary health centre, with total 14 beds and 2 doctors (excluding private bodies). It had 38 family welfare subcentres. 4,862 patients were treated indoor and 238,750 patients were treated outdoor in the hospitals, health centres and subcentres of the CD Block.

Islampur subdivisional hospital at Islampur (with 136 beds) is located outside the Islampur CD block. There is a primary health centre at Sujali (with 4 beds).
