= Goalpokhar I =

- Community development block
- Interactive map of Goalpokhar I
- Coordinates: 26.08°N 88.13°E
- Country: India
- State: West Bengal
- District: Uttar Dinajpur

Area
  - Total: 365.11 km^{2} (140.97 sq mi)

Population (2011)
  - Total: 326,120
  - Density: 893.21/km^{2} (2,313.4/sq mi)

Languages
  - Official: Bengali, English, Urdu
- Time zone: UTC+5:30 (IST)
- ISO 3166 code: IN-WB
- Lok Sabha constituency: Raiganj
- Vidhan Sabha constituency: Goalpokhar
- Website: uttardinajpur.nic.in

Goalpokhar I is a community development block that forms an administrative division in Islampur subdivision of Uttar Dinajpur district in the Indian state of West Bengal.

== History ==
Historically the western frontier of ancient Pundravardhana kingdom, bordering ancient Anga of Mahabharat fame, the Dinajpur area remained somewhat obscure in the major empires that held sway over the region and beyond till the rise of the Dinajpur Raj during the Mughal period. Some areas later forming a part of Uttar Dinajpur were parts of kingdoms in Nepal. Dinajpur district was constituted by the British in 1786, with a portion of the estate of Dinajpur Raj. Subsequent to the Permanent Settlement in 1793, the semi-independent Dinajpur Raj was further broken down and some of its tracts were transferred to the neighbouring British districts of Purnea, Malda, Rajshahi and Bogra. In 1947, the Radcliffe Line placed the Sadar and Thakurgaon subdivisions of Dinajpur district in East Pakistan. The Balurghat subdivision of Dinajpur district was reconstituted as West Dinajpur district in West Bengal. Raiganj subdivision was formed in 1948.

In order to restore territorial links between northern and southern parts of West Bengal which had been snapped during the partition of Bengal, and on the recommendations of the States Reorganisation Commission a portion of the erstwhile Kishanganj subdivision comprising Goalpokhar, Islampur and Chopra thanas (police stations) and parts of Thakurganj thana, along with the adjacent parts of the erstwhile Gopalpur thana in Katihar subdivision were transferred from Purnea district in Bihar to West Bengal in 1956, and were formally incorporated into Raiganj subdivision in West Dinajpur. The township of Kishanganj and its entire municipal boundary remained within Bihar. Islampur subdivision was formed in March 1959. At the same time, the portion of Chopra PS lying to the north of the Mahananda river covering an area that now comprises Bidhannagar-1 gram panchayat, Bidhannagar-2 GP, Chathat-Bansgaon GP and the southern half of Phansidewa-Bansgaon Kismat GP in Darjeeling district, was transferred from West Dinajpur to the jurisdiction of Phansidewa PS in Darjeling district. With the introduction of the Community Development Programme in 1960–61, community development blocks were set up in West Dinajpur district.

In 1992, West Dinajpur district was bifurcated and Uttar Dinajpur district was established.

== Geography ==
Goalpokhar is located at 26°05′N 88°08′E.

Uttar Dinajpur district has a flat topography and slopes gently from north to south. All rivers flow in that direction. Except for the eastern fringes of Chopra CD Block, most of the district is a part of the catchment area of the Mahanada and also a part of the larger Barind Tract The soil is composed of different varieties of alluvium. The main rivers are: Nagar, Mahananda, Kulik, Gamari, Chhiramati (Srimati) and Tangon. The rivers have little water in the dry season but with heavy rains, during monsoon, overflow the banks. The Nagar river flows along the international border with Bangladesh on the east of Goalpohar I CD Block. The Sartano river flows through the CD Block and Sudana river on the eastern part.

There is one river flowing from north to south in the eastern border of Goalpokhar I block and that river acts as the natural border between West Bengal of India and Bangladesh. The BSF has done much fencing alongside the river. Because of this fencing, a huge area of cultivable land has fallen on the other side of the river which is not accessible to the farmers of this region and it causes lot of trouble to the farmers because it is almost as if they have lost their cultivable lands because of the fencing by the BSF.

Goalpokhar I CD Block is bounded by Islampur CD Block on the north, Baliadangi, Ranisankail and Haripur Upazilas in Thakurgaon District of Bangladesh on the east, Karandighi CD Block on the south and Goalpokhar II CD Block and Kishanganj CD Block in Kishanganj district of Bihar on the west.

Approximately 206 km of the India-Bangladesh border is in Uttar Dinajpur district. It covers the eastern boundary of the district. On the western side Uttar Dinajpur district has 227 km boundary with Bihar.

Goalpokhar I CD Block has an area of 365.11 km^{2}.It has 1 panchayat samity, 14 gram panchayats, 204 gram sansads (village councils), 153 mouzas and 144 inhabited villages. Goalpokhar police station serves this block. Headquarters of this CD Block is at PO Panjipara, Goalpokhar.

Uttar Dinajpur district is one of the smaller districts in the state and stands 15th in terms of area (3,140.00 km^{2}) in the state.

Gram panchayats of Goalpokhar I block/ panchayat samiti are: Dharampur I, Dharampur II, Goagaon I, Goagaon II, Goalpokher, Goti, Jaingaon, Khagore, Lodhan, Mahua, Panjipara, Pokharia, Sahapur I. Sahapur II.

== Demographics ==
=== Population ===
As per the 2011 Census of India, Goalpokhar I CD Block had a total population of 326,120, of which 320,121 were rural and 5,939 were urban. There were 169,954 (52%) males and 156,166 (48%) females. Population below 6 years was 61,875. Scheduled Castes numbered 43,442 (13.32%) and Scheduled Tribes numbered 12,595 (3.86%).

As per 2001 census, Goalpokhar I block had a total population of 245,603, out of which 126,706 were males and 118,897 were females. Goalpokhar I block registered a population growth of 26.56 per cent during the 1991-2001 decade. Decadal growth for the district was 28.72 per cent.

The only census town in Goalpokhar I CD Block was (2011 population in brackets): Hanskunda (5,939).

Large villages (with 4,000+ population) in Goalpokhar I CD Block were (2011 population in brackets): Majlishpur (7,802), Churakuti (5,257), Panjipara (12,376), Teliapokhar (5,362), Majhok (4,709), Pokharia (5,541), Mahua (16,080), Jaingaon (10,866), Chhota Patna (4,186), Khargar (5,422), Raypur (4,433), Dharampur (5,255), Bara Singhanath (5,464), Angarbhasa (4,208), Athiala (5,887), Goalpokhar (4,500), Babhanbari (4,088), Goalin (6,623), Debiganj (6,457), Agoi (4,308) and Sholpara (4,045).

Other villages in Goalpokhar I CD Block included (2011 population in brackets): Goagaon (2,150) and Lodhan (3,955).

Decadal Population Growth Rate (%)

Note: The CD Block data for 1971–1981, 1981-1991 and 1991-2001 is for Goalpokhar PS covering both Goalpokhar I and Goalpokhar II blocks

The decadal growth of population in Goalpokhar CD Block in 2001-2011 was 31.88%. The decadal growth of population in Goalpokhar PS in 1991-2001 was 30.19%, in 1981-91 was 27.06% and in 1971-81 was 33.39%. The decadal growth rate of population in Uttar Dinajpur district was as follows: 30.2% in 1971–81, 34.0% in 1981–91, 28.7% in 1991-2001 and 23.2% in 2001–11. The decadal growth rate for West Bengal was 13.93% in 2001–2011, 17.77% in 1991–2001. 24.73% in 1981-1991 and 23.17% in 1971–1981.

Uttar Dinajpur district has the highest decadal population growth rate in West Bengal with a figure of 23.2% for the decade 2001-2011 and is much higher than the state average of 13.8%.

According to the Human Development Report for Uttar Dinajpur district, population growth in the area that later became Uttar Dinajpur district was low in the pre-independence era and started picking up with the waves of East Bengali refugees coming in from erstwhile East Pakistan. Despite the formation of an international border in 1947, none of the PS areas in the area which later formed Islampur SD showed much increase in settlement density between 1941 and 1951, and accelerated settlement only came into evidence in this region after 1961, following their transfer from Bihar to West Bengal. Thus, as population growth in the Uttar Dinajpur region accelerated considerably under the impetus of partition migration after 1951, the Islampur SD areas offered additional living space, easing the overall migration pressure on the region.

The Human Development Report analyses, “A spurt in population growth rates first became evident between 1951-1961, and was further magnified between 1971-81 after the creation of Bangladesh when population growth in most districts bordering the Bangladesh-West Bengal frontier showed similar escalation. However, after 1981, when population growth in most other West Bengal districts had tapered off, growth rates in Uttar Dinajpur again showed a fresh spurt. Thus, no deceleration in population growth rates occurred in the district until after 1991… In addition to Hindu and tribal migrants from across the international border, a sizeable number of migrant Muslims have also settled in the district, mainly driven by economic reasons… migrants from other states comprised 23% of the total migrants residing in Uttar Dinajpur.” The large number of migrants from other states is mainly from the neighbouring areas in Bihar.

A study by North Bengal University has observed that “Immigrants from East Pakistan/Bangladesh have arrived in Uttar Dinajpur in almost equal numbers before and after 1971.” The Human Development Report opines, “The overall post-Partition impact on the rates of demographic growth has been particularly strong in all North Bengal districts. Despite its smaller relative size, the region has received more migration in pro rata terms than the West Bengal districts lying south of the Ganga.”

=== Literacy ===
As per the 2011 census, the total number of literates in Goalpokhar I CD Block was 111,662 (42.26% of the population over 6 years) out of which males numbered 67,441 (48.80% of the male population over 6 years) and females numbered 44,221 (35.08% of the female population over 6 years). The gender disparity (the difference between female and male literacy rates) was 13.72%.

The literacy rate in Uttar Dinajpur district at 60.13% in 2011, up from 47.89% in 2001, was the lowest amongst all districts of West Bengal. The highest literacy rate amongst the districts of West Bengal was that of Purba Medinipur district at 87.66% in 2011.

According to the Human Development Report for Uttar Dinajpur district, “Goalpokhar-1, Goalpokhar-2, Karandighi and Islampur blocks in that order stood at the very bottom of the literacy scale in the state. This pooling of illiteracy within Islampur SD also led to the low ranking of Uttar Dinajpur at 494th position out of 595 Indian districts in terms of literacy rates in 2001, despite which its rank had improved considerably in relative terms from the 523rd rank it had occupied in 1991.”

The five blocks transferred from the state of Bihar to form a new subdivision in West Dinajpur in 1959 had until 1956 been part of the Kishanganj region which is still characterised by a low overall literacy rate of 31 percent in 2006–07, against which the corresponding rate for Uttar Dinajpur as a whole is a literacy rate of 48 percent... “Like Kishanganj which is now a full-fledged Bihar district, Islampur SD too has a largely rural profile, a large Muslim population and deep concentration of rural poverty”... Persisting regional disparities in access to education and infrastructure, rather than the response and enthusiasm of the local people are largely responsible for making Uttar Dinajpur the least literate district in West Bengal. “Thus, a major challenge facing the district relates to the improvement of educational attainments of the weaker social sections and women, especially among the Muslim community which has a dominant presence in the Islampur SD region… A huge gulf separates the Muslim literacy rate of 36 percent in Uttar Dinajpur from the Muslim literacy rate of 58 percent achieved by West Bengal as a whole.”

See also – List of West Bengal districts ranked by literacy rate

See also - Literacy in Bihar

Literacy in CD blocks of
Uttar Dinajpur district
Raiganj subdivision
Raiganj – 63.52%
Hemtabad – 67.88%
Kaliaganj – 66.50%
Itahar – 58.95%
Islampur subdivision
Chopra – 59.90%
Islampur – 53.53%
Goalpokhar I – 42.26%
Goalpokhar II – 46.07%
Karandighi – 53.42%
Source: 2011 Census: CD Block Wise
Primary Census Abstract Data

=== Language and religion ===
Religion in Goalpokhar I CD Block (2011)
| Islam | 77.26% |
| Hinduism | 22.35% |
| Other or not stated | 0.39% |

In the 2011 census, Muslims numbered 251,965 and formed 77.26% of the population in Goalpokhar I CD Block. Hindus numbered 72,892 and formed 22.35% of the population. Christians numbered 676 and formed 0.21% of the population. Others numbered 587 and formed 0.18% of the population. In Goalpokhar I and Goalpokhar II CD Blocks taken together, as per the District Statistical Handbook for Uttar Dinajpur, while the proportion of Muslims increased from 67.71% in 1991 to 68.82% in 2001, the proportion of Hindus declined from 31.69% in 1991 to 30.19% in 2001.

In the 2011 census, Uttar Dinajpur district had 1,501,170 Muslims who formed 49.92% of the population, 1,482,943 Hindus who formed 49.31% of the population, 16,702 Christians who formed 0.56% of the population and 6,319 persons belonging to other religions who formed 0.23% of the population. While the proportion of Muslim population in the district increased from 45.3% in 1991 to 49.9% in 2011, the proportion of Hindu population declined from 54.2% in 1991 to 49.2% in 2011.

Languages of Goalpokhar I CD block (2011)
1. Urdu (47.5%)
2. Bengali (31.1%)
3. Surjapuri (15.1%)
4. Santali (2.99%)
5. Hindi (2.21%)
6. Others (1.07%)

In 2001, Bengali was the mother-tongue of 66.8% of the population of Uttar Dinajpur district, followed by Surajpuri (11.7%), Urdu (9.8%), Hindi (4.0%), Santali (4.0%), Telugu (0.4%), Kurukh/Oraon (0.3%), Bhojpuri (0.3%), Sadan/ Sadri (0.1%), Nepali (0.1%) and Maithili (0.1%). Other languages spoken were: Rajbansi, Oriya, Marwari and Munda. The proportion of population having Bengali as their mother tongue increased from 72.2% in 1961 to 76.5% in 1991 and then dropped to 66.8% in 2001. The proportion of population having Surajpuri as their mother tongue increased from 3.3% in 1991 to 11.7% in 2001. The proportion of population having Urdu as their mother tongue decreased from 10.1% in 1961 to 6.0% in 1971 and then increased to 9.8% in 2001. Information about mother-tongue is available only at the district level and above. In the District Census Handbook for Uttar Dinajpur district covering 2011 census, the mother-tongue information is provided for the period 1961 to 2001.

The Human Development Report for Uttar Dinajpur describes the Islampur subdivision as “a region where Urdu and Hindi are widely spoken as a first language because of the prior transfer of this territory to West Bengal from Bihar”

As per the West Bengal Official Language (Amendment) Act, 2012, which came into force from December 2012, Urdu was given the status of official language in areas, such as subdivisions and blocks, having more than 10% Urdu speaking population. In Uttar Dinajpur district, Goalpokhar I and II blocks, Islampur block and Islampur municipality were identified as fulfilling the norms set. In 2014, Calcutta High Court, in an order, included Dalkhola municipality in the list.

== Rural poverty ==
As per the Rural Household Survey conducted in 2002, 59.2% of the rural families in Goalpokhar I CD Block belonged to the BPL category, against 46.7% of rural families in Uttar Dinajpur district being in the BPL category. As per the Human Development Report for Uttar Dinajpur district, “The two Goalpokhar blocks are placed in the least favourable positions in Uttar Dinajpur, both because of low levels of human development and high concentration of exclusion and human poverty. Goalpokhar-1 nevertheless does better than Itahar in terms of Human Poverty Index (HPI). Goalpokhar-2, on the other hand, is incontrovertibly the least developed block of Uttar Dinajpur district, with the lowest levels of human development and the highest concentration of human poverty”.

== Economy ==
=== Livelihood ===
Livelihood
in Goalpokhar I CD Block
1. Cultivators (31.1%)
2. Agricultural labourers (47.1%)
3. Household industries (3.71%)
4. Other Workers (18.1%)

In Goalpokhar I CD Block in 2011, amongst the class of total workers, cultivators numbered 31,366 and formed 31.10%, agricultural labourers numbered 47,488 and formed 47.08%, household industry workers numbered 3,744 and formed 3.71% and other workers numbered 18,236 and formed 18.11%. Total workers numbered 100,866 and formed 30.93% of the total population, and non-workers numbered 225,254 and formed 69.07% of the population.

Note: In the census records a person is considered a cultivator, if the person is engaged in cultivation/ supervision of land owned by self/government/institution. When a person who works on another person's land for wages in cash or kind or share, is regarded as an agricultural labourer. Household industry is defined as an industry conducted by one or more members of the family within the household or village, and one that does not qualify for registration as a factory under the Factories Act. Other workers are persons engaged in some economic activity other than cultivators, agricultural labourers and household workers. It includes factory, mining, plantation, transport and office workers, those engaged in business and commerce, teachers, entertainment artistes and so on.

=== Infrastructure ===
There are 144 inhabited villages in Goalpokhar I CD Block. All 144 villages (100%) have power supply. All 104 villages (100%) have drinking water supply. 28 villages (19.44%) have post offices. 119 villages (82.64%) have telephones (including landlines, public call offices and mobile phones). 59 villages (40.97%) have a pucca (paved) approach road and 49 villages (34.03%) have transport communication (includes bus service, rail facility and navigable waterways). 4 villages (2.78%) have agricultural credit societies. 8 villages (5.56%) have banks.

=== Agriculture ===
“With its distinctive physiographic and agroclimatic features, the Dinajpur region has been a bread-basket area of Bengal for many centuries, growing multiple varieties of fine and coarse rice in vast quantities, along with major economic crops like jute. The livelihood profile of Uttar Dinajpur district has evolved in association with these old agricultural patterns, and more than two-thirds of its active workforce still draws livelihoods directly from agriculture and related occupations.”

Agricultural potential has been uneven across Uttar Dinajpur based on soil conditions and irrigation potential. This has generated considerable internal migration within the district, as areas with higher agricultural potential and higher labour demand has attracted large number of people. The impact of land reforms has also varied. As the Islampur subdivision blocks evolved initially under the Bihar administration, the land estates were larger in size and the extent of land acquired under ceiling laws were higher. The cultivator population in Islampur subdivision was also thinner. Such conditions have been favourable for migrants. The movement of people from agricultural activities to non-agricultural activities has been low in Uttar Dinajpur district except for some pockets.

Goalpokhar I CD Block had 159 fertiliser depots, 19 seed stores and 81 fair price shops in 2013–14.

In 2013–14, Goalpokhar I CD Block produced 47,362 tonnes of Aman paddy, the main winter crop from 21,766 hectares, 9,794 tonnes of Boro paddy (spring crop) from 4,217 hectares, 160 tonne of Aus paddy (summer crop) from 90 hectares, 13,807 tonnes of wheat from 5,925 hectares, 6,017 tonnes of maize from 2,471 hectares, 62,316 tonnes of jute from 5,386 hectares and 32,756 tonnes of potatoes from 1,480 hectares. It also produced pulses and oilseeds.

In 2013–14, the total area irrigated in Goalpokhar I CD Block was 319 hectares, out of which 79 hectares were irrigated by river lift irrigation and 240 hectares by deep tube wells.

=== Craft based activities ===
“More than eleven hundred rural households across the district are engaged in traditional crafts based industries, among which dhokra, mat making, terracotta, village pottery and bamboo craft in the Goalpokhar-1 and Kaliaganj regions are notable.”

=== Banking ===
In 2012–13, Goalpokhar I CD Block had offices of five commercial banks and four gramin banks.

=== Backward Regions Grant Fund ===
Uttar Dinajpur district is listed as a backward region and receives financial support from the Backward Regions Grant Fund. The fund, created by the Government of India, is designed to redress regional imbalances in development. As of 2012, 272 districts across the country were listed under this scheme. The list includes 11 districts of West Bengal.

== Transport ==
Goalpokhar I CD Block has 5 originating/ terminating bus routes. The nearest railway station is 20 km from CD Block headquarters

The Howrah–New Jalpaiguri line passes through Goalpokhar I CD Block and there are stations at Ikarchala and Panjipara railway station. In the early 1960s, when Farakka Barrage was being constructed, a far reaching change was made. Indian Railways constructed a new broad-gauge rail link from south Bengal to connect North Bengal.

National Highway 27 passes through Goalpokhar I CD Block.

== Education ==
In 2012–13, Goalpokhar I CD Block had 121 primary schools with 30,965 students, 16 middle schools with 4,862 students, 7 high schools with 2,192 students and 7 higher secondary schools with 14,459 students. Goalpokhar I CD Block had 522 institutions for special and non-formal education with 50,429 students.

As per the 2011 census, in Golpokhar CD Block, amongst the 144 inhabited villages, 14 villages did not have a school, 91 villages had 1 or more primary schools, 38 villages had at least 1 primary and 1 middle school and 15 villages had at least 1 middle and 1 secondary school.

The mid-day meal programme for rural school children was launched in 2005 in Uttar Dinajpur district. As on 30 April 2015, 602,557 children in 3,006 schools were covered under this programme.

Shree Agrasen Mahavidyalaya was established in 1995 at Dalkhola (outside the CD block).

== Healthcare ==
In 2013, Goalpokhar I CD Block had 1 block primary health centre and 1 primary health centre, with total 40 beds and 4 doctors (excluding private bodies). It had 40 family welfare subcentres. 4,762 patients were treated indoor and 202,752 patients were treated outdoor in the hospitals, health centres and subcentres of the CD Block.

Lodhan rural hospital at PO Goalpokhar (with 30 beds) is the main medical facility in Goalpokhar I CD block. There is a primary health centre at Goagaon (with 10 beds).
