= Chopra =

Chopra may refer top:

- Chopra (surname), an Indian surname
- Chopra clan, a Gurjar clan in the Punjab region of Pakistan and India
- Chopda (or Chopra), a city in Maharashtra
- Kotra Chopra, a village in Madhya Pradesh
- Chopratown, a comedy drama from BBC
- Named portions of West Bengal in India:
  - Chopra, Uttar Dinajpur, town
  - Chopra (community development block), Uttar Dinajpur district
  - Chopra (Vidhan Sabha constituency) (i.e., in the government assembly
