= Haskhari =

Town in West Bengal, India

Haskhari Hanskhari
- Town
- Location in West Bengal, India Haskhari (India)
- Coordinates: 26°23′26″N 88°19′58″E
- Country: India
- State: West Bengal
- District: Uttar Dinajpur
- Tehsil: Haskhari

Population (2011)
  - Total: 22,634 (according to Census data)

Languages
  - Official: Bengali, Hindi, English
- Time zone: UTC+5:30 (IST)
- PIN: 733207 (Haskhari)
- Telephone/STD code: 03526
- Lok Sabha constituency: Darjeeling
- Vidhan Sabha constituency: Chopra
- Website: uttardinajpur.nic.in

Haskhari (previously Hanskhari) is a town in the Chopra CD block in the Islampur subdivision of the Uttar Dinajpur district in the Indian state of West Bengal.

== Geography ==
Cities and towns in Islampur subdivision of Uttar Dinajpur district
M: municipal town/ city/notified area, CT: census town, R: rural/ urban centre.
Owing to space constraints in the small map, the actual locations in a larger map may vary slightly

=== Location ===
Haskhari is directly connected to Chopra, Islampur, Kishanganj, Raiganj in the south & Sonapur, Bidhannagar, Bakdogra, Siliguri in the north by bus.

== Demographics ==
As of 2011 India census, Haskhari had a population of 22,634. Males constitute 51% of the population and females 49%. Haskhari has an average literacy rate of 69%, higher than the national average of 59.5%: male literacy is 73%, and female literacy is 64%. In Haskhari, 16% of the population is under 6 years of age.

Religions in Haskhari
Religion	Percent
Muslims	87%
Hindus	11%
Jains	0.2%
Others†	0.7%
Distribution of religions †Includes Sikhs (0.2%), Buddhists (<0.2%).

== Transport ==
=== Bus ===
Travelling by road is easier from Haskhari as it has National Highway NH34, lots of Government buses, Private buses, Cars, Rickshaws etc are available for travelling by road.

=== Train ===
Aluabari Station is the main railway station for travelling by train.

=== Air ===
Bagdogra airport is the nearby airport for travelling by aeroplane.
