= Goalpokhar =

- Village
- Location in West Bengal, India Goalpokhar (India)
- Coordinates: 26.0914°N 88.1426°E
- Country: India
- State: West Bengal
- District: Uttar Dinajpur

Population (2011)
  - Total: 4,500

Languages
  - Official: Bengali, English, Urdu
- Time zone: UTC+5:30 (IST)
- Lok Sabha constituency: Raiganj
- Vidhan Sabha constituency: Goalpokhar
- Website: uttardinajpur.nic.in

Goalpokhar is a village in Goalpokhar I CD block in Islampur subdivision of Uttar Dinajpur district in the state of West Bengal, India.

== Geography ==
Cities and towns in the Uttar Dinajpur district
M: municipal city/ town, CT: census town, R: rural/ urban centre, T: tourist centre
Owing to space constraints in the small map, the actual locations in a larger map may vary slightly

=== Location ===
Goalpokhar is located at 26.0914°N 88.1426°E

In the map alongside, all places marked on the map are linked in the full screen version.

=== Police station ===
Goalpokhar police station under West Bengal police has jurisdiction over Goalpokhar I CD Block and parts of Goalpokhar II CD Block. It is 76 km from the district headquarters and covers an area of 354 km^{2} 40 km of the India-Bangladesh border is in the area covered by Goalpokhar PS.

=== CD block HQ ===
The headquarters of Goalpokhar I CD block is at Goalpokhar.

== Demographics ==
As per the 2011 Census of India, Goalpokhar had a total population of 4,500, of which 2,392 (53%) were males and 2,108 (47%) were females. Population below 6 years was 873. The total number of literates in Goalpokhar was 1,522 (41.96% of the population over 6 years).

== Official languages ==
As per the West Bengal Official Language (Amendment) Act, 2012, which came into force from December 2012, Urdu was given the status of official language in areas, such as subdivisions and blocks, having more than 10% Urdu speaking population. In Uttar Dinajpur district, Goalpokhar I and II blocks, Islampur block and Islampur municipality were identified as fulfilling the norms set. In 2014, Calcutta High Court, in an order, included Dalkhola municipality in the list.

== Education ==
Ashraful Uloom Jr. High Madrasah School, established at Jainagaon, Goalpokhar in 1987, is a co-educational Urdu-medium unaided private school with arrangements for teaching from class VI to VIII. It has a play ground.

== Healthcare ==
Lodhan rural hospital at PO Goalpokhar (with 30 beds) is the main medical facility in Goalpokhar I CD block.
