= Chopra (community development block) =

- Community development block
- Interactive map of Chopra
- Coordinates: 26.4°N 88.3°E
- Country: India
- State: West Bengal
- District: Uttar Dinajpur
- Established: 1964

Government
  - Type: Community development block

Area
  - Total: 480.82 km^{2} (185.65 sq mi)

Population (2014)
  - Total: 384,403
  - Density: 799.47/km^{2} (2,070.6/sq mi)

Languages
  - Official: Bengali, English
- Time zone: UTC+5:30 (IST)
- Postal code: 733207
- Lok Sabha constituency: Darjeeling
- Vidhan Sabha constituency: Chopra
- Website: uttardinajpur.nic.in

Chopra is community development block that forms an administrative division in Islampur subdivision of Uttar Dinajpur district in the Indian state of West Bengal.

== History ==
Historically the western frontier of ancient Pundravardhana kingdom, bordering Anga of Mahabharat fame, the Dinajpur area remained somewhat obscure in the major empires that held sway over the region and beyond till the rise of the Dinajpur Raj during the Mughal period. Some areas later forming a part of Uttar Dinajpur were parts of kingdoms in Nepal. Dinajpur district was constituted by the British in 1786, with a portion of the estate of Dinajpur Raj. Subsequent to the Permanent Settlement in 1793, the semi-independent Dinajpur Raj was further broken down and some of its tracts were transferred to the neighbouring British districts of Purnea, Malda, Rajshahi and Bogra. In 1947, the Radcliffe Line placed the Sadar and Thakurgaon subdivisions of Dinajpur district in East Pakistan. The Balurghat subdivision of Dinajpur district was reconstituted as West Dinajpur district in West Bengal. Raiganj subdivision was formed in 1948.

In order to restore territorial links between northern and southern parts of West Bengal which had been snapped during the partition of Bengal, and on the recommendations of the States Reorganisation Commission a portion of the erstwhile Kishanganj subdivision comprising Goalpokhar, Islampur and Chopra thanas (police stations) and parts of Thakurganj thana, along with the adjacent parts of the erstwhile Gopalpur thana in Katihar subdivision were transferred from Purnea district in Bihar to West Bengal in 1956, and were formally incorporated into Raiganj subdivision in West Dinajpur. The township of Kishanganj and its entire municipal boundary remained within Bihar. Islampur subdivision was formed in March 1959. At the same time, the portion of Chopra PS lying to the north of the Mahananda river covering an area that now comprises Bidhannagar-1 gram panchayat, Bidhannagar-2 GP, Chathat-Bansgaon GP and the southern half of Phansidewa-Bansgaon Kismat GP in Darjeeling district, was transferred from West Dinajpur to the jurisdiction of Phansidewa PS in Darjeeling district. With the introduction of the Community Development Programme in 1960-61, community development blocks were set up in West Dinajpur district.

In 1992, West Dinajpur district was bifurcated and Uttar Dinajpur district was established.

== Geography ==
Chopra is located at 26°24′N 88°18′E.

Chopra Block established in the year 1964.

Uttar Dinajpur district has a flat topography and slopes gently from north to south. All rivers flow in that direction. Except for the eastern fringes of Chopra CD Block, most of the district is a part of the catchment area of the Mahanada and also a part of the larger Barind Tract. The soil is composed of different varieties of alluvium. The main rivers are: Nagar, Mahananda, Kulik, Gamari, Chhiramati (Srimati) and Tangon. The rivers have little water in the dry season but with heavy rains, during monsoon, overflow the banks. The Mahananda flows along the north-western edge of Chopra CD Block, forming the boundary with Darjeeling district. The Kurto river flows along a part of the international border with Bangladesh.

Chopra CD Block is bounded by Phansidewa CD Block in Darjeeling district and Tetulia Upazila in Panchagarh district of Bangladesh on the north, Panchagarh Sadar and Atwari Upazilas in Panchagarh District of Bangladesh on the east, Islampur CD Block on the south, and Pothia and Thakurganj CD Blocks in Kishanganj district of Bihar on the west.

Approximately 206 km of the India-Bangladesh border is in Uttar Dinajpur district. It covers the eastern boundary of the district. On the western side Uttar Dinajpur district has 227 km boundary with Bihar.

Border Stretch of Chopra : Bangladesh-65 km, Bihar-26 km, Darjeeling-14 km.

Chopra CD Block has an area of 380.82 km^{2}. It has 1 panchayat samity, 8 gram panchayats, 156 gram sansads (village councils), 119 mouzas and 116 inhabited villages. Chopra police station serves this block. Headquarters of this CD Block is at Chopra.

Uttar Dinajpur district is one of the smaller districts in the state and stands 15th in terms of area (3,140.00 km^{2}) in the state.

Sap nikla forest is under Chopra block. The lake and the forest attract tourists.

Eight Gram panchayats of Chopra Block/ Chopra Panchayat samiti are: Chopra, Chutikhore, Daspara, Ghirnigaon, Haptiagachh, Lakhipur, Majhiali and Sonarpur.

== Demographics ==
=== Population ===
As per the 2011 Census of India, Chopra CD Block had a total population of 284,403, of which 278,826 were rural and 5,777 were urban. There were 147,073 (52%) males and 137,330 (48%) females. Population below 6 years was 49,741. Scheduled Castes numbered 50,818 (17.87%) and Scheduled Tribes numbered 20,041 (7.05%).

As per 2001 census, Chopra block had a total population of 223,046, out of which 115,244 were males and 107,802 were females. Chopra block registered a population growth of 34.59 per cent during the 1991-2001 decade. Decadal growth for the district was 28.72 per cent.

The only census town in Chopra CD Block was (2011 population in brackets): Chopra (5,777).

Large villages (with 4,000+ population) in Chopra CD Block were (2011 population in brackets): Dakshin Jibhakata (8,774), Ghiringaon Khas (12,300), Lakhipur (11,383), Shitalgaon (6,126), Purbba Chutiakhor (12,220), Dakshin Kundal Pukhar (4,103), Uttar Gorasahid (5,004), Paschim Chutiakhor (10,289), Rajabhim (5,868), Bhagabati (11,233), Bhagalpur Khas (6,484), Borobila (4,185), Jiakhori (7,335) and Chitalghata (12,988).

Other villages in Chopra CD Block included (2011 population in brackets): Majhiali (750), and Ghirnigaon (2,640).

View source data.

Note: The CD Block data for 1971–1981, 1981–1991 and 1991–2001 is for Chopra PS covering the block

The decadal growth of population in Chopra CD Block in 2001-2011 was 24.93%. The decadal growth of population in Chopra PS in 1991-2001 was 34.58%, in 1981-91 was 28.77% and in 1971-81 was 26.71%. The decadal growth rate of population in Uttar Dinajpur district was as follows: 30.2% in 1971-81, 34.0% in 1981-91, 28.7% in 1991-2001 and 23.2% in 2001-11. The decadal growth rate for West Bengal was 13.93% in 2001-2011, 17.77% in 1991-2001. 24.73% in 1981-1991 and 23.17% in 1971-1981.

Uttar Dinajpur district has the highest decadal population growth rate in West Bengal with a figure of 23.2% for the decade 2001-2011 and is much higher than the state average of 13.8%.

According to the Human Development Report for Uttar Dinajpur district, population growth in the area that later became Uttar Dinajpur district was low in the pre-independence era and started picking up with the waves of East Bengali refugees coming in from erstwhile East Pakistan. Despite the formation of an international border in 1947, none of the PS areas in the area which later formed Islampur SD showed much increase in settlement density between 1941–51, and accelerated settlement only came into evidence in this region after 1961, following their transfer from Bihar to West Bengal. Thus, as population growth in the Uttar Dinajpur region accelerated considerably under the impetus of partition migration after 1951, the Islampur SD areas offered additional living space, easing the overall migration pressure on the region.

The Human Development Report analyses, "A spurt in population growth rates first became evident between 1951-1961, and was further magnified between 1971-81 after the creation of Bangladesh when population growth in most districts bordering the Bangladesh-West Bengal frontier showed similar escalation. However, after 1981, when population growth in most other West Bengal districts had tapered off, growth rates in Uttar Dinajpur again showed a fresh spurt. Thus, no deceleration in population growth rates occurred in the district until after 1991… In addition to Hindu and tribal migrants from across the international border, a sizeable number of migrant Muslims have also settled in the district, mainly driven by economic reasons… migrants from other states comprised 23% of the total migrants residing in Uttar Dinajpur." The large number of migrants from other states is mainly from the neighbouring areas in Bihar.

A study by North Bengal University has observed that “Immigrants from East Pakistan/Bangladesh have arrived in Uttar Dinajpur in almost equal numbers before and after 1971.” The Human Development Report opines, “The overall post-Partition impact on the rates of demographic growth has been particularly strong in all North Bengal districts. Despite its smaller relative size, the region has received more migration in pro rata terms than the West Bengal districts lying south of the Ganga.”

=== Literacy ===
As per the 2011 census, the total number of literates in Chopra CD Block was 140,560 (59.90% of the population over 6 years) out of which males numbered 81,939 (67.38% of the male population over 6 years) and females numbered 58,621 (51.85% of the female population over 6 years). The gender disparity (the difference between female and male literacy rates) was 15.52%.

The literacy rate in Uttar Dinajpur district at 60.13% in 2011, up from 47.89% in 2001, was the lowest amongst all districts of West Bengal. The highest literacy rate amongst the districts of West Bengal was that of Purba Medinipur district at 87.66% in 2011.

According to the Human Development Report for Uttar Dinajpur district, “Goalpokhar-1, Goalpokhar-2, Karandighi and Islampur blocks in that order stood at the very bottom of the literacy scale in the state. This pooling of illiteracy within Islampur SD also led to the low ranking of Uttar Dinajpur at 494th position out of 595 Indian districts in terms of literacy rates in 2001, despite which its rank had improved considerably in relative terms from the 523rd rank it had occupied in 1991.”

The five blocks transferred from the state of Bihar to form a new subdivision in West Dinajpur in 1959 had until 1956 been part of the Kishanganj region which is still characterised by a low overall literacy rate of 31 percent in 2006-07, against which the corresponding rate for Uttar Dinajpur as a whole is a literacy rate of 48 percent... “Like Kishanganj which is now a full-fledged Bihar district, Islampur SD too has a largely rural profile, a large Muslim population and deep concentration of rural poverty”... Persisting regional disparities in access to education and infrastructure, rather than the response and enthusiasm of the local people are largely responsible for making Uttar Dinajpur the least literate district in West Bengal. “Thus, a major challenge facing the district relates to the improvement of educational attainments of the weaker social sections and women, especially among the Muslim community which has a dominant presence in the Islampur SD region… A huge gulf separates the Muslim literacy rate of 36 percent in Uttar Dinajpur from the Muslim literacy rate of 58 percent achieved by West Bengal as a whole.”

See also – List of West Bengal districts ranked by literacy rate

See also - Literacy in Bihar

Literacy in CD blocks of
Uttar Dinajpur district
Raiganj subdivision
Raiganj – 63.52%
Hemtabad – 67.88%
Kaliaganj – 66.50%
Itahar – 58.95%
Islampur subdivision
Chopra – 59.90%
Islampur – 53.53%
Goalpokhar I – 42.26%
Goalpokhar II – 46.07%
Karandighi – 53.42%
Source: 2011 Census: CD Block Wise
Primary Census Abstract Data

=== Language and religion ===
Religion in Chopra CD Block (2011)
Islam	64.01%
Hinduism	33.92%
Christianity	1.83%
Other or not stated	0.24%

In the 2011 census, Muslims numbered 182,050 and formed 64.01% of the population in Chopra CD Block. Hindus numbered 96,469 and formed 33.92% of the population. Christians numbered 5,235 and formed 1.83% of the population. Others numbered 659 and formed 0.24% of the population. In Chopra CD Block, as per the District Statistical Handbook for Uttar Dinajpur, while the proportion of Muslims increased from 61.10% in 1991 to 62.34% in 2001, the proportion of Hindus declined from 37.55% in 1991 to 35.61% in 2001.

Languages of Chopra CD block (2011)
1. Bengali (52.7%)
2. Surjapuri (33.2%)
3. Santali (2.69%)
4. Sadri (2.35%)
5. Hindi (2.25%)
6. 'Other' Bengali (2.24%)
7. Rajbongshi (1.53%)
8. Others (3.10%)

The Human Development Report for Uttar Dinajpur describes the Islampur subdivision as “a region where Urdu and Hindi are widely spoken as a first language because of the prior transfer of this territory to West Bengal from Bihar”

== Rural poverty ==
As per the Rural Household Survey conducted in 2002, 50.6% of the rural families in Chopra CD Block belonged to the BPL category, against 46.7% of rural families in Uttar Dinajpur district being in the BPL category. As per the Human Development Report for Uttar Dinajpur district, Chopra CD Block, located far to the north, ranked 7th amongst the CD Blocks in Uttar Dinajpur district in the Human Poverty Index (HPI), has been able to ensure greater equity in human development and comparatively lower concentration of poverty.

== Economy ==
=== Livelihood ===
Livelihood
in Chopra CD Block
1. Cultivators (21.8%)
2. Agricultural labourers (25.4%)
3. Household industries (2.12%)
4. Other Workers (50.7%)

In Chopra CD Block in 2011, amongst the class of total workers, cultivators numbered 19,733 and formed 21.82%, agricultural labourers numbered 22,955 and formed 25.38%, household industry workers numbered 1,917 and formed 2.12% and other workers numbered 45,824 and formed 50.67%. Total workers numbered 90,429 and formed 31.80% of the total population, and non-workers numbered 193,974 and formed 68.20% of the population.

Note: In the census records a person is considered a cultivator, if the person is engaged in cultivation/ supervision of land owned by self/government/institution. When a person who works on another person's land for wages in cash or kind or share, is regarded as an agricultural labourer. Household industry is defined as an industry conducted by one or more members of the family within the household or village, and one that does not qualify for registration as a factory under the Factories Act. Other workers are persons engaged in some economic activity other than cultivators, agricultural labourers and household workers. It includes factory, mining, plantation, transport and office workers, those engaged in business and commerce, teachers, entertainment artistes and so on.

=== Infrastructure ===
There are 116 inhabited villages in Chopra CD Block. All 116 villages (100%) have power supply. 114 villages (98.28%) have drinking water supply. 25 villages (21.55%) have post offices. 110 villages (94.83%) have telephones (including landlines, public call offices and mobile phones). 42 villages (36.1%) have a pucca (paved) approach road and 44 villages (37.93%) have transport communication (includes bus service, rail facility and navigable waterways). 4 villages (3.45%) have agricultural credit societies. 11 villages (9.48%) have banks.

=== Agriculture ===
"With its distinctive physiographic and agroclimatic features, the Dinajpur region has been a bread-basket area of Bengal for many centuries, growing multiple varieties of fine and coarse rice in vast quantities, along with major economic crops like jute. The livelihood profile of Uttar Dinajpur district has evolved in association with these old agricultural patterns, and more than two-thirds of its active workforce still draws livelihoods directly from agriculture and related occupations."

Agricultural potential has been uneven across Uttar Dinajpur based on soil conditions and irrigation potential. This has generated considerable internal migration within the district, as areas with higher agricultural potential and higher labour demand has attracted large number of people. The impact of land reforms has also varied. As the Islampur subdivision blocks evolved initially under the Bihar administration, the land estates were larger in size and the extent of land acquired under ceiling laws were higher. The cultivator population in Islampur subdivision was also thinner. Such conditions have been favourable for migrants. The movement of people from agricultural activities to non-agricultural activities has been low in Uttar Dinajpur district except for some pockets. The strong impact of the shift from cultivation to tea plantations in Chopra CD Block is seen in the dominant presence of other non-farm workers within the rural workforce.

Chopra CD Block had 4-5 tea gardens in the pre-independence era. In the post-partition period, many migrants took to pineapple growing. As bottle necks in pineapple transportation to big city markets affected pineapple cultivation, many pineapple growers switched over to small tea gardens. In 1999. Production of tea by the small growers in the region rose from 13.1 million kg in 1999 to 36.5 million kg in 2003. There were 62 bought leaf factories in the area in 2003.

Chopra CD Block had 132 fertiliser depots, 12 seed stores and 40 fair price shops in 2013-14.

In 2013-14, Chopra CD Block produced 28,870 tonnes of Aman paddy, the main winter crop from 2,254 hectares, 1,029 tonnes of Boro paddy (spring crop) from 422 hectares, 7 tonnes of Aus paddy (summer crop) from 4 acres, 2,119 tonnes of wheat from 953 hectares, 2,783 tonnes of maize from 1,143 hectares, 31,170 tonnes of jute from 3,638 hectares and 24,709 tonnes of potatoes from 684 hectares. It also produced maskalai and oilseeds.

In 2013-14, the total area irrigated in Chopra CD Block was 3,167 hectares, out of which 3,150 hectares were irrigated by canal water and 17 hectares by river lift irrigation.

=== Craft based activities ===
"More than eleven hundred rural households across the district are engaged in traditional crafts based industries, among which dhokra, mat making, terracotta, village pottery and bamboo craft in the Goalpokhar-1 and Kaliaganj regions are notable."

=== Banking ===
In 2012-13, Chopra CD Block had offices of 8 commercial banks and 1 gramin banks.

=== Backward Regions Grant Fund ===
Uttar Dinajpur district is listed as a backward region and receives financial support from the Backward Regions Grant Fund. The fund, created by the Government of India, is designed to redress regional imbalances in development. As of 2012, 272 districts across the country were listed under this scheme. The list includes 11 districts of West Bengal.

== Transport ==
Chopra CD Block has 2 ferry services and 5 originating/ terminating bus routes. The nearest railway station is 10 km from the CD Block headquarters.

The Howrah–New Jalpaiguri line passes through the western edge of Chopra CD Block.

National Highway 27 passes through Chopra town and Chopra CD Block.

== Education ==
In 2012-13, Chopra CD Block had 142 primary schools with 33,310 students, 17 middle schools with 2,570 students, 6 high schools with 4,910 students and 17 higher secondary schools with 28,186 students. Chopra CD Block had 479 institutions for special and non-formal education with 38,499 students.

As per the 2011 census, in Chopra CD Block, amongst the 116 inhabited villages, 13 villages did not have a school, 84 villages had 1 or more primary schools, 19 villages had at least 1 primary and 1 middle school and 11 villages had at least 1 middle and 1 secondary school.

The mid-day meal programme for rural school children was launched in 2005 in Uttar Dinajpur district. As on 30 April 2015, 602,557 children in 3,006 schools were covered under this programme.

Chopra Kamala Paul Smriti Mahavidyalaya was established in 2013-14 at Chopra.

== Culture ==
=== Little magazine ===
'Unmukta Dwar' is the only little magazine which published from Chopra. Editor Alok Sarkar. He also published child-magazine,'Rosgolla'. In 1997 Alok and his three friends are started that publishing work. But first little-mag of Chopra is 'Ankur', that was handmade, Editor Pradip Shikdar who was headmaster also.

== Healthcare ==
In 2013, Chopra CD Block had 1 block primary health centre and 3 primary health centres, with total 50 beds and 4 doctors (excluding private bodies). It had 34 family welfare subcentres. 4,129 patients were treated indoor and 353,135 patients were treated outdoor in the hospitals, health centres and subcentres of the CD Block.

Dalua rural hospital at Dalua (with 30 beds) is the main medical facility in Chopra CD block. There are primary health centres at Sonapur (with 6 beds), Daspara (with 10 beds), Lakshmipur (with 4 beds).
