= Chakulia (disambiguation) =

Chakulia may refer to:

- Chakulia, a town in Purbi Singhbhum district in the state of Jharkhand, India
- Chakulia Airport
- Chakulia, Uttar Dinajpur, a village in West Bengal
- Chakulia block, a community development block in Jharkhand, India
