= Islampur subdivision =

- Subdivision
- Interactive map of Islampur subdivision
- Coordinates: 26.27°N 88.20°E
- Country: India
- State: West Bengal
- District: North Dinajpur
- Headquarters: Islampur

Languages
  - Official: Bengali, English, Urdu
- Time zone: UTC+5:30 (IST)
- ISO 3166 code: ISO 3166-2:IN
- Vehicle registration: WB 91& WB 92
- Website: wb.gov.in

Islampur subdivision is an administrative subdivision of the Uttar Dinajpur district in the Indian state of West Bengal. This subdivision was earlier a part of Bihar and was transferred to West Bengal with the passing of the States Reorganisation Act in 1956.

== Subdivisions ==
Uttar Dinajpur district is divided into two administrative subdivisions:

Subdivision	Headquarters	Area km^{2} (2001)	Population (2011)	Urban population % (2011)	Rural Population % (2011)
Raiganj	Raiganj	1,350.56	1,337,229	19.39	80.61
Islampur	Islampur	1,768.57	1,669,895	6.17	93.83
Uttar Dinajpur district	Raiganj	3,140.00	3,007,134	12.05	87.95

== Administrative units ==
Islampur subdivision has 5 police stations, 5 community development blocks, 5 panchayat samitis, 59 gram panchayats, 757 mouzas, 730 inhabited villages, 2 municipalities and 2 census towns. The municipalities are at Islampur and Dalkhola. The census towns are: Chopra and Hanskunda. The subdivision has its headquarters at Islampur.

== Police stations ==
Police stations in Islampur subdivision have the following features and jurisdiction:

Police station	Area covered (km^{2})	Border (km)	Population	Municipal town/ city	CD Block
Islampur	331.20	n/a	241,910	Islampur	Islampur
Chopra	378.40	n/a	283,761	-	Chopra
Goalpokhar	354	40	320,810	-	Goalpokhar I, Goalpokhar II (part)
Chakulia	266.04	-	290,850	-	Goalpokhar II (part)
Dalkhola	?	-	199,000	Dalkhola	Karandighi (part), Goalpokhar II (part)
Karandighi	388.42	n/a	318,677	-	Karandighi (part)

== Blocks ==
Community development blocks in Islampur subdivision are:

CD Block	Headquarters	Area km^{2}	Population (2011)	SC %	ST %	Hindus %	Muslims %	Literacy rate %	Census Towns
Islampur	Islampur	329.44	308,518	16.99	2.90	27.56	72.13	53.53	-
Chopra	Chopra	380.82	284,403	17.87	7.05	33.92	64.01	59.90	1
Goalpokhar I	Goalpokhar	365.11	326,120	13.32	3.86	22.35	77.26	42.26	1
Goalpokhar II	Chakulia	298.69	291,252	22.28	6.06	34.52	64.14	46.07	-
Karandighi	Karandighi	390.52	368,322	29.30	7.81	45.74	53.71	53.42	-

== Gram panchayats ==
The subdivision contains 59 gram panchayats under 5 community development blocks:

- Chopra block: Rural area consists of eight gram panchayats, viz. Chopra, Daspara, Haptiagachh, Majhiali, Chutiakhore, Ghirnigaon, Lakhipur and Sonapur.
- Goalpokhar I block: Rural area consists of 14 gram panchayats, viz. Dharampur–I, Goti, Lodhan, Sahapur–I, Dharampur–II, Goalpokhar, Mahua, Sahapur–II, Goagachh–I, Jaingaon, Panjipara, Goagachh–II, Khagore and Pokharia.
- Goalpokhar II block: Rural area consists of 11 gram panchayats, viz. Belon, Kanki, Sahapur–I, Sahapur-II, Surjapur-I, Surjapur–II, Baidyanandapur, Nijampur–I, Nijampur–II, Troyal, and Chakulia.
- Islampur block: Rural area consists of 13 gram panchayats, viz. Agdimti–Khanti, Gunjaria, Matikunda–II, Ramganj–II, Gaisal–I, Islampur, Panditpota–I, Gaisal–II, Kamalgaon–Sujali, Panditpota–II, Gobindapur, Matikunda–I and Ramganj–I.
- Karandighi block: Rural area consists of 13 gram panchayats, viz. Altapur–I, Boris mouja, jhal no-210 Dalkhola–I, Lahutara–I, Rasakhowa–II, Altapur–II, Domohona, Lahutara–II, Bazargaon–I, Karandighi–I, Raniganj, Bazargaon–II, Karandighi–II and Rasakhowa–I.

== Education ==
Uttar Dinajpur district had a literacy rate of 59.07% (for population of 7 years and above) as per the census of India 2011. Raiganj subdivision had a literacy rate of 66.94%, Islampur subdivision 52.40%.

Given in the table below (data in numbers) is a comprehensive picture of the education scenario in Uttar Dinajpur district for the year 2012-13:

Subdivision	Primary School		Middle School		High School		Higher Secondary School		General College, Univ		Technical / Professional Instt		Non-formal Education	
Subdivision	Institution	Student	Institution	Student	Institution	Student	Institution	Student	Institution	Student	Institution	Student	Institution	Student
Raiganj	810	104,842	83	7,836	18	9,525	140	146,367	4	18,334	6	973	2,218	111,064
Islampur	760	171,598	72	14,226	27	22,437	86	121,719	2	9,683	1	47	2,648	221,977
Uttar Dinajpur district	1,570	276,440	155	22,062	45	31,962	226	268,086	6	28,017	7	1,020	4,866	333,041

Note: Primary schools include junior basic schools; middle schools, high schools and higher secondary schools include madrasahs; technical schools include junior technical schools, junior government polytechnics, industrial technical institutes, industrial training centres, nursing training institutes etc.; technical and professional colleges include engineering colleges, medical colleges, para-medical institutes, management colleges, teachers training and nursing training colleges, law colleges, art colleges, music colleges etc. Special and non-formal education centres include sishu siksha kendras, madhyamik siksha kendras, centres of Rabindra mukta vidyalaya, recognised Sanskrit tols, institutions for the blind and other handicapped persons, Anganwadi centres, reformatory schools etc.

The following institutions are located in Islampur subdivision:

- Islampur College was established in 1973 at Islampur.
- Shree Agrasen Mahavidyalaya was established in 1995 at Dalkhola.
- Chopra Kamala Paul Smriti Mahavidyalaya was established in 2013-14 at Chopra.

== Healthcare ==
The table below (all data in numbers) presents an overview of the medical facilities available and patients treated in the hospitals, health centres and sub-centres in 2013 in Uttar Dinajpur district.

Subdivision	Health & Family Welfare Deptt, WB				Other State Govt Deptts	Local bodies	Central Govt Deptts / PSUs	NGO / Private Nursing Homes	Total	Total Number of Beds	Total Number of Doctors*	Indoor Patients	Outdoor Patients
Subdivision	Hospitals	Rural Hospitals	Block Primary Health Centres	Primary Health Centres	Other State Govt Deptts	Local bodies	Central Govt Deptts / PSUs	NGO / Private Nursing Homes	Total	Total Number of Beds	Total Number of Doctors*	Indoor Patients	Outdoor Patients
Raiganj	2	-	3	10	1	1	-	6	23	774	67	61,438	1,274,032
Islampur	1	1	4	9	-	-	-	7	22	455	59	50,520	1,500,160
Uttar Dinajpur district	3	1	7	19	1	1	-	13	45	1,229	126	112,058	2,774,192

.* Excluding nursing homes

Medical facilities available in Islampur subdivision are as follows:

Hospitals: (Name, location, beds)
Islampur Subdivisional Hospital, Islampur, 136 beds
Rural Hospitals: (Name, CD block, location, beds)
Karandighi Rural Hospital, Karandighi CD block, Karandighi, 30 beds
Lodhan Rural Hospital, Goalpokhar I CD block, Goalpokhar, 30 beds
Chakulia Rural Hospital, Goalpokhar II CD block, Chakulia, 30 beds
Dalua Rural Hospital, Chopra CD block, Dalua, 30 beds
Primary Health Centres: (CD Block-wise)(CD block, PHC location, beds)
Karandighi CD block: Dalkhola (6), Rasakbowa (10)
Goalpokhar I CD block: Goagaon (10)
Goalpokhar II CD block: Kanki (10), Toryal (2)
Islampur CD block: Sujali (4)
Chopra CD block: Sonapur (6), Daspara (10), Lakshmipur (4)

== Electoral constituencies ==
Lok Sabha (parliamentary) and Vidhan Sabha (state assembly) constituencies in Islampur subdivision were as follows:

Lok Sabha constituency	Reservation	Vidhan Sabha constituency	Reservation	CD Block and/or Gram panchayats and/or municipal areas
Raiganj	None	Islampur	None	Islampur municipality, and Agdimti Khanti, Gaisal I, Gaisal II, Gunjaria, Islampur, Matikunda I, Matikunda II, Panditpota I, Panditpota II, Ramganj I and Ramganj II GPs of Islampur CD block
		Goalpokhar	None	Goalpokhar I CD block
		Chakulia	None	Goalpokhar II CD block and Bazargaon I and Bazargaon II GPs of Karandighi CD block
		Karandighi	None	Altapur I, Altapur II, Dalkhola I, Dalkhola II, Domhana, Karandighi I, Karandighi II, Lahutara I, Lahutara II, Raniganj, Rasakhowa I and Rasakhowa II GPs of Karandighi CD Block
		Other assembly segments outside the subdivision		
Darjeeling	None	Chopra	None	Chopra CD block and Kamalagaon Sujali GP of Islampur
		Other assembly segments outside the subdivision		
