= Ikarchala railway station =

Railway station in West Bengal

General information
- Location: Sarnabari, Ikarchala, Uttar Dinajpur district, West Bengal; India
- Coordinates: 26°09′40″N 88°03′26″E
- Elevation: 56 m (184 ft)
- System: Passenger train station
- Owner: Indian Railways
- Operator: Northeast Frontier Railway
- Line: Howrah–New Jalpaiguri line
- Platforms: 1
- Tracks: 2

Construction
- Structure type: Standard (on ground station)

Other information
- Status: Active
- Station code: IKC
- Zone(s): Northeast Frontier Railway
- Division(s): Katihar

History
- Former names: East Indian Railway Company

Services
Preceding station	Indian Railways	Following station
Gaisal towards ?	Eastern Railway zone Howrah–New Jalpaiguri line	Panjipara towards ?
Location

Ikarchala railway station is a halt railway station on Katihar–Siliguri branch of Howrah–New Jalpaiguri line in the Katihar railway division of Northeast Frontier Railway zone. It is situated at Sarnabari, Ikarchala of Uttar Dinajpur district in the Indian state of West Bengal. Ikarchala railway station serves Goalpokhar I block and surrounding areas.
