= Karandighi, Uttar Dinajpur =

Karandighi
- Village
- Location in West Bengal, India Karandighi (India)
- Coordinates: 25.8175°N 87.9184°E
- Country: India
- State: West Bengal
- District: Uttar Dinajpur

Population (2011)
  - Total: 1,653

Languages
  - Official: Bengali, English
- Time zone: UTC+5:30 (IST)
- Lok Sabha constituency: Raiganj
- Vidhan Sabha constituency: Karandighi
- Website: uttardinajpur.nic.in

Karandighi is a village in Karandighi CD block in Islampur subdivision of Uttar Dinajpur district in the state of West Bengal, India.

== Etymology ==
This area was part of the ancient kingdom of Anga and Karna, of Mahabharata fame, was closely associated with the area. The mythological associations are linked with the name Karandighi.

== Geography ==
Cities and towns in the Uttar Dinajpur district
M: municipal city/ town, CT: census town, R: rural/ urban centre, T: tourist centre
Owing to space constraints in the small map, the actual locations in a larger map may vary slightly

=== Location ===
Karandighi is located at 25.8175°N 87.9184°E

In the map alongside, all places marked on the map are linked in the full screen version.

=== Police station ===
Karandighi police station under West Bengal police has jurisdiction over Karandighi CD block. It is 45 km from the district headquarters and covers an area of 388.42 km^{2}.

=== CD block HQ ===
The headquarters of Karandighi CD block is at Karandighi village.

== Demographics ==
As per the 2011 Census of India, Karandighi had a total population of 1,653, of which 844 (51%) were males and 809 (49%) were females. Population below 6 years was 234. The total number of literates in Karandighi was 813 (57.29% of the population over 6 years).

== Transport ==
National Highway 12 (old number NH 34) passes through Karandighi.

== Education ==
Karandighi High School was established in 1956. KARANDIGHI KASTURBA GURLS HIGH SCHOOL ALSO THERE

== Healthcare ==
Karandighi rural hospital at Karandighi (with 30 beds) is the main medical facility in Karandighi CD block.
