= Hanskunda =

- Census Town
- Location in West Bengal, India Hanskunda (India)
- Coordinates: 26.1492°N 88.0367°E
- Country: India
- State: West Bengal
- District: Uttar Dinajpur

Population (2011)
  - Total: 5,939

Languages
  - Official: Bengali, English, Urdu
- Time zone: UTC+5:30 (IST)
- Vehicle registration: WB
- Lok Sabha constituency: Raiganj
- Vidhan Sabha constituency: Goalpokhar
- Website: uttardinajpur.nic.in

Hanskunda is a census town in Goalpokhar I CD Block in Islampur subdivision of Uttar Dinajpur district in the state of West Bengal, India.

== Geography ==
Cities and towns in the Uttar Dinajpur district
M: municipal city/ town, CT: census town, R: rural/ urban centre, T: tourist centre
Owing to space constraints in the small map, the actual locations in a larger map may vary slightly

=== Location ===
Hanskunda is located at 26.1492°N 88.0367°E Hanskunda is not marked in Google maps. It is shown in the District Census Handbook.

In the map alongside, all places marked on the map are linked in the full screen version.

== Demographics ==
As per the 2011 Census of India, Hanskunda had a total population of 5,939, of which 3,065 (52%) were males and 2,874 (48%) were females. Population below 6 years was 975. The total number of literates in Hanskunda was 3,219 (64.85% of the population over 6 years).

== Official languages ==
As per the West Bengal Official Language (Amendment) Act, 2012, which came into force from December 2012, Urdu was given the status of official language in areas, such as subdivisions and blocks, having more than 10% Urdu speaking population. In 2014, Calcutta High Court, in an order, included Dalkhola municipality in the list.

== Transport ==
National Highway 27 passes through Hanskunda and Panjipara railway station is located nearby.
