= Panjipara railway station =

Railway station in West Bengal, India

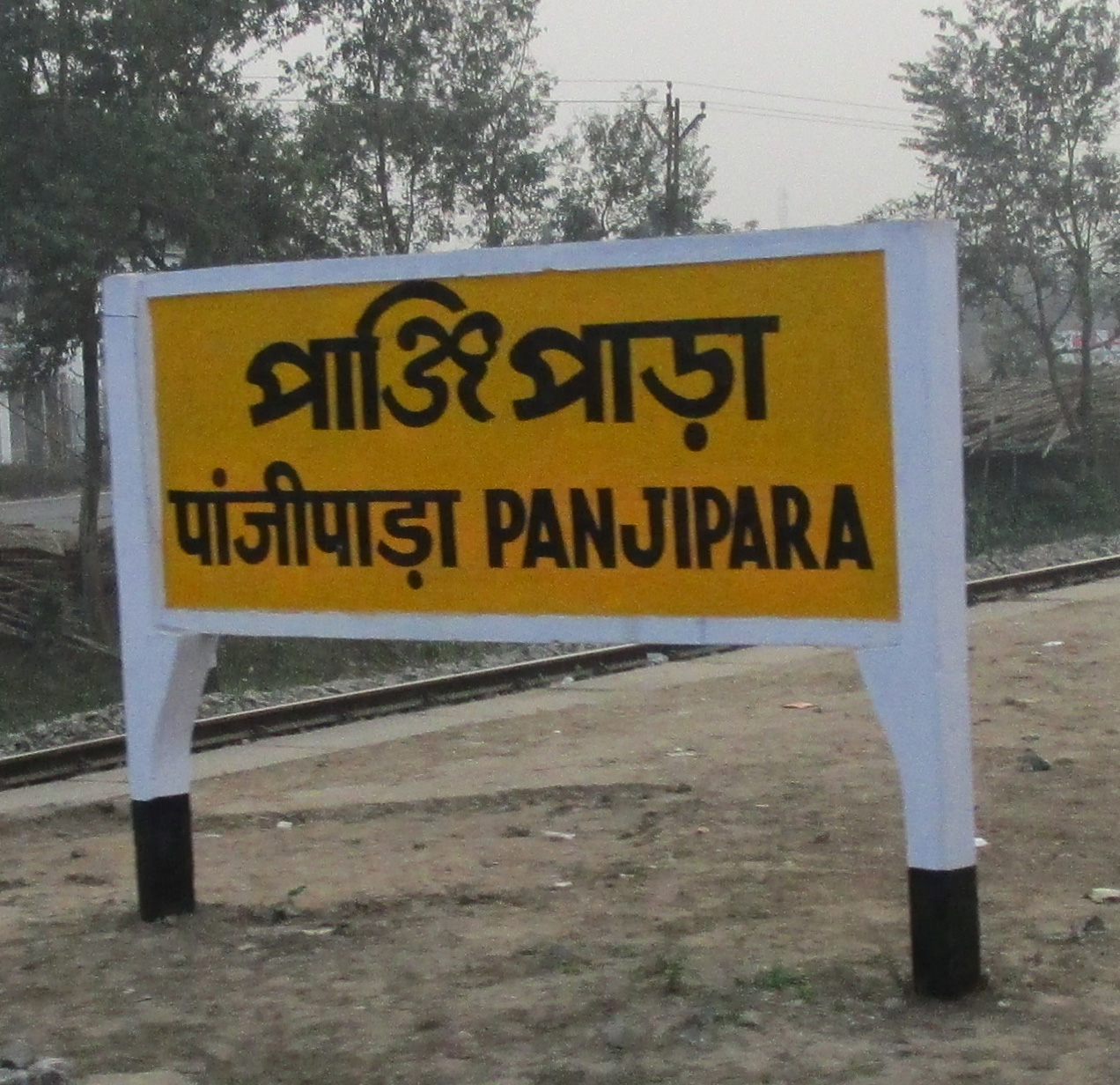

General information
- Location: National Highway 27, Hanskunda, Panjipara, Uttar Dinajpur district, West Bengal; India
- Coordinates: 26°49′29″N 88°09′00″E
- Elevation: 55 m (180 ft)
- System: Passenger train station
- Owner: Indian Railways
- Operator: Northeast Frontier Railway
- Line: Howrah–New Jalpaiguri line
- Platforms: 2
- Tracks: 4
- Connections: ticket booking counter available

Construction
- Structure type: Standard (on ground station)
- Parking: not available

Other information
- Status: Active
- Station code: PJP
- Zone(s): Northeast Frontier Railway
- Division(s): Katihar

History
- Former names: East Indian Railway Company

Services
Preceding station	Indian Railways	Following station
Ikarchala towards ?	Eastern Railway zone Howrah–New Jalpaiguri line	Kishanganj towards ?
Location

Panjipara railway station is a railway station on Katihar–Siliguri branch of Howrah–New Jalpaiguri line in the Katihar railway division of Northeast Frontier Railway zone. It is situated beside National Highway 27 at Hanskunda, Panjipara of Uttar Dinajpur district in the Indian state of West Bengal.
