= Chakulia, Uttar Dinajpur =

Chakulia Chakalia
- Gram panchayat
- Location in West Bengal, India Chakulia (India)
- Coordinates: 26.0213510°N 87.9524920°E
- Country: India
- State: West Bengal
- District: Uttar Dinajpur

Population (2011)
  - Total: 2,424

Languages
  - Official: Bengali, English, Urdu
- Time zone: UTC+5:30 (IST)
- Postal code: 733211
- Lok Sabha constituency: Raiganj
- Vidhan Sabha constituency: Chakulia
- Website: uttardinajpur.nic.in

Chakulia is a gram panchayat with a police station of Islampur Police District in Goalpokhar II CD block in Islampur subdivision of Uttar Dinajpur district in the Indian state of West Bengal.

== Geography ==
Cities and towns in the Uttar Dinajpur district
M: municipal city/ town, CT: census town, R: rural/ urban centre, T: tourist centre
Owing to space constraints in the small map, the actual locations in a larger map may vary slightly

=== Location ===
Chakulia, one of the villages in the Chakulia gram panchayat, is located at 26.0213510°N 87.9524920°E.

In the map alongside, all places marked on the map are linked in the full screen version.

Chakulia is a gram panchayat under Goalpokhar-II intermediate panchayat. Census villages under Chakulia gram panchayat are as follows: Chakulia, Kalibari, Gerua, Kahata, Kaliara, Beharia, Ghordhappa, Bhuindhar, Birran, Pataura, Bara Pokharia, Andharia, Kanki, Puar, Pirdauli, Mathura, Dhakania, Gochhra, Majra, Haripur, Pipla, Urpi, Kariat, Baligora, pathatty, and Bara Shikarpur, Bidyananda Pur, ladhi, Kanjia, Pathati.

Website: www.chakulia.webs.com

=== Police station ===
Chakulia police station under West Bengal police has jurisdiction over Goalpokhar II CD Block. It is 62 km from the district headquarters and covers an area of 266.04 km^{2}.

== Demographics ==
As per the 2011 Census of India, Chakulia had a total population of 2,424, of which 1,251 (52%) were males and 1,173 (48%) were females. Population below 6 years was 415. The total number of literates in Chakulia was 1,055 (52.51% of the population over 6 years).

== Official languages ==
As per the West Bengal Official Language (Amendment) Act, 2012, which came into force from December 2012, Urdu was given the status of official language in areas, such as subdivisions and blocks, having more than 10% Urdu speaking population. In Uttar Dinajpur district, Goalpokhar I and II blocks, Islampur block and Islampur municipality were identified as fulfilling the norms set. In 2014, Calcutta High Court, in an order, included Dalkhola municipality in the list.

== Education ==
- Chakulia High School
- Ramkrishnapur P.D.G.M. High School
- Shakuntala High School
- Shirshi I.M Senior Madrasah
- Nizampur High Madrasah
- Chakulia Jr. Girls High School
- Haripur Jr. High School
- Ramkrishnapur Primary Vidyalaya
- Adarsha M.S.K. Bhuidar
- Toryal High School
- Manora High School
- Lahil Nisindra Madarsa Nisindra Madarsa M.S.K.
- Bidhanpally Primary school
- Lahil M.S.K.
- Hatwar S.S.K
- Kanki Jain Vidya Mandir
- Khikhirtola M.S.K.

== Computer education ==
Rajeev Gandhi Computer Saksharta Mission

== Healthcare ==
Chakulia rural hospital at Chakulia (with 30 beds) is the main medical facility in Goalpokhar II CD block.
