= Chopra clan =

Punjabi clan in Pakistan and India

Chopra
- Religions: Hinduism; Sikhism; Jain
- Languages: Gujari; Punjabi; Haryanvi; Dogri; Pahari; Hindi; Urdu
- Country: India; Pakistan
- Region: Punjab, Pakistan; Rajasthan; Punjab, India; Jammu and Kashmir; Haryana; Azad Kashmir; Himachal Pradesh; Uttar Pradesh; Uttarakhand
- Ethnicity: Gurjar (Gujjar)

Chopra, is a clan found in the Gurjar Punjabi ethnic community of Pakistan and India.

They are mainly adherents of Hinduism, Sikhism and Islam. The variations of the name include Chopra, Chonpra, or Chupra.

== Ethnography ==
Some Chopra Gujjar families have settled in Punjab, and Azad Kashmir, Pakistan, but the vast majority of them live in the northern Indian states of Himachal Pradesh, Uttarakhand, Punjab (mainly in the districts of Gurdaspur, Ludhiana and Hoshiarpur), Haryana and Jammu and Kashmir.

== Sources ==
1. James M. Campbell (1880) Gazetteer of the Bombay Presidency: Under Government Orders. Khàndesh. Volume XII [Dr.]: Government Central Press. p. 67
2. Horace Arthur Rose (1911) A Glossary of the Tribes and Castes of the Punjab and North-West Frontier Province Low Price Publications. p. 182 "CHONPRA, a Gujar clan (agricultural) found in Amritsar."
3. V.Verma (2000) Ban-Gujars: A Nomadic Tribe in Himachal Pradesh B.R. Publishing Corporation. p. 104 ISBN 9788176461122
