= Kotra Chopra =

- village
- Location within Madhya Pradesh Location within India
- Coordinates: 23.4498113°N 77.4529868°E
- Country: India
- State: Madhya Pradesh
- District: Bhopal
- Tehsil: Berasia
- Elevation: 469 m (1,539 ft)

Population (2011)
  - Total: 999
- Time zone: UTC+5:30 (IST)
- ISO 3166 code: MP-IN
- 2011 census code: 482309

Kotra Chopra is a village in the Bhopal district of Madhya Pradesh, India. It is located in the Berasia tehsil.

== Demographics ==
According to the 2011 census of India, Kotra Chopra has 179 households. The effective literacy rate (i.e. the literacy rate of population excluding children aged 6 and below) is 65.03%.

Demographics (2011 Census)
| | Total | Male | Female |
|---|---|---|---|
| Population | 999 | 529 | 470 |
| Children aged below 6 years | 164 | 91 | 73 |
| Scheduled caste | 104 | 58 | 46 |
| Scheduled tribe | 106 | 52 | 54 |
| Literates | 543 | 333 | 210 |
| Workers (all) | 548 | 303 | 245 |
| Main workers (total) | 473 | 286 | 187 |
| Main workers: Cultivators | 141 | 126 | 15 |
| Main workers: Agricultural labourers | 244 | 109 | 135 |
| Main workers: Household industry workers | 35 | 15 | 20 |
| Main workers: Other | 53 | 36 | 17 |
| Marginal workers (total) | 75 | 17 | 58 |
| Marginal workers: Cultivators | 5 | 3 | 2 |
| Marginal workers: Agricultural labourers | 42 | 7 | 35 |
| Marginal workers: Household industry workers | 7 | 0 | 7 |
| Marginal workers: Others | 21 | 7 | 14 |
| Non-workers | 451 | 226 | 225 |
