= Islampur College =

College in West Bengal

- Type: Undergraduate college Public college
- Established: 1973; 53 years ago
- Academic affiliations: University of North Bengal
- Principal: Dr. Chittajit Sarkar
- Location: Islampur, West Bengal, 733202, India; 26.2683°N 88.2065°E
- Campus: Urban
- Language: Bengali, English
- Website: https://www.islampurcollege.ac.in/
- Location within West Bengal Location within India

Islampur College, established in 1973, is the general degree college in Islampur, in the Uttar Dinajpur district. It offers Graduate courses in Arts, Commerce and Science. It is affiliated to University of North Bengal.

== Departments ==
- Bengali
- Chemistry
- Commerce
- Economics
- English
- Geography
- Hindi
- History
- Philosophy
- Physics
- Mathematics (Honours)
- Political Science (Honours)
- Urdu (اردو)

== Accreditation ==
The college is recognized by the University Grants Commission (UGC).

== See also ==
- List of institutions of higher education in West Bengal
- Education in India
- Education in West Bengal
