= Chopra, Uttar Dinajpur =

Chopra
- Census Town
- Location in West Bengal, India Chopra (India)
- Coordinates: 26.3675°N 88.3076°E
- Country: India
- State: West Bengal
- District: Uttar Dinajpur

Population (2011)
  - Total: 5,777

Languages
  - Official: Bengali, English
- Time zone: UTC+5:30 (IST)
- Vehicle registration: WB
- Lok Sabha constituency: Darjeeling
- Vidhan Sabha constituency: Chopra
- Website: uttardinajpur.nic.in

Chopra is a census town in Chopra CD Block in Islampur subdivision of Uttar Dinajpur district in the state of West Bengal, India.

== Geography ==
Cities and towns in the Uttar Dinajpur district
M: municipal city/ town, CT: census town, R: rural/ urban centre, T: tourist centre
Owing to space constraints in the small map, the actual locations in a larger map may vary slightly

=== Location ===
Chopra is located at 26.3675°N 88.3076°E.

In the map alongside, all places marked on the map are linked in the full screen version.

=== Police station ===
Chopra police station under West Bengal police has jurisdiction over Chopra CD Block. It is 145 km from the district headquarters and covers an area of 378.40 km^{2}.

=== CD block HQ ===
The headquarters of Chopra CD block is at Chopra.

== Demographics ==
As per the 2011 Census of India, Chopra had a total population of 5,777, of which 2,997 (52%) were males and 2,780 (48%) were females. The population below 6 years was 841. The total number of literates in Chopra was 3,388 (68.64% of the population over 6 years).

== Transport ==
National Highway 27 passes through Chopra.

== Education ==
Chopra Kamala Paul Smriti Mahavidyalaya was established in 2013-14 at Chopra. Affiliated to the North Bengal University, it offers honours courses in Bengali, history and political science. Urdu is taught as a general subject.

Chopra High School is a Bengali-medium coeducational higher secondary school established in 1968. Housed in a government building it has facilities for teaching from class VI to XII. It has 18 computers, a library and a playground.

Chopra Girls High School is Bengali-medium girls only higher secondary school established in 1979. Housed in a government building it has facilities for teaching from class VI to XII. It has 11 computers, a library and a playground.

== Healthcare ==
Dalua rural hospital at Dalua (with 30 beds), the main medical facility in Chopra CD block, is located nearby.
