= Literacy in Bihar =

Bihar has a total literacy rate of 70.9% in 2017. Overall Male and Female literacy rate is 79.7% and 60.5% respectively. Total Rural literacy rate is 59.5%. In rural areas of Bihar, Male and Female literacy rate is 18.6% and 58.7% respectively. Total Urban literacy rate is 13.1%. In urban areas of Bihar, Male and Female literacy rate is 89.3% and 75.9% respectively. Total number of literates in Bihar is 3,16,75,607 which consists of 2,09,78,955 Male and 1,06,96,652 Female. Patna has highest Literacy Rate of 87.82% followed by Rohtas (80.36%) and Munger (78.11%). Kishanganj has lowest Literacy Rate of 61.05% followed by Araria (64.95%) and Katihar (65.46%). A recent survey by Pratham rated the receptivity of Bihari children to their teaching as being better than those in other states. Bihar is striving to increase female literacy, now at 60.5%. At the time of independence, women's literacy in Bihar was 4.20%.

== Overview of literacy rates ==
Literacy rates in Bihar
	Total	Males	Females
Total Literacy rate (NSC Survey 2017)	70.9%	79.7%	60.5%
Rural areas	69.5%	78.6%	58.7%
Urban areas	83.1%	89.3%	75.9%
Total numbers of literates	3,16,75,607	2,09,78,955	1,06,96,652

Highest and lowest literacy rates by district
District	Literacy rate
Rohtas	73.37%
Bhojpur	72.79%
Patna	70.68%
	| | |
Katihar	52.24%
Purnea	51.18%
Sitamarhi	51.08%

A recent survey by Pratham rated the receptivity of Bihari children to their teaching as being better than those in other states. Bihar is striving to increase female literacy, now at 60.5%. At the time of independence, women's literacy in Bihar was 4.22%.

The state's low literary rates stem from the region's complex educational challenges. Education in Bihar significantly lags behind other states in India.

== Growth in Literacy Rate ==
Literacy Rate from 1951–2025
Year	Total	Males	Females
1951	13.45	22.68	4.20
1961	21.98	35.85	8.11
1971	22.86	35.86	9.86
1981	31.86	47.11	16.61
1991	36.68	51.37	21.99
2001	46.94	60.32	33.57
2011	61.35	71.20	51.50
2017	70.90	79.70	60.50
2025	74.30	—	—

== Anubhav ==
Education in Bihar
Level	Total	Male	Female
Literate with education	17,15,049	11,09,731	6,05,318
Below Primary	78,90,329	47,54,137	31,36,192
Primary	83,34,709	51,30,917	32,03,792
Middle	43,90,226	30,12,151	13,78,075
Secondary	47,51,560	34,39,918	13,11,642
Higher Secondary	18,26,093	13,85,282	4,40,811
Technical Diploma	24,989	20,088	4,901
Non-technical Diploma	48,532	40,458	8,074
Graduate & above	21,09,415	17,37,651	3,71,764
Unclassified	18,675	14,043	4,632

== Literacy in Districts ==
Literacy in Bihar
Districts of Bihar	2011			2001			1991		
Districts of Bihar	Total	By gender		Total	By gender		Total	By gender	
Districts of Bihar	Total	Male	Female	Total	Male	Female	Total	Male	Female
West Champaran	55.7			39.63	51.91	25.85	27.99	39.62	14.41
East Champaran	55.79			42.74	67.90	74.47	44.41	58.49	85.45
Sheohar	53.78			37.01	45.54	27.43	26.18	36.36	14.34
Sitamarhi	52.05			39.38	51.02	26.35	28.49	39.86	15.49
Madhubani	58.62			42.35	57.26	26.56	33.22	48.49	16.75
Supaul	57.67			37.8	53.23	21.02	28.11	40.96	13.74
Araria	53.53			34.94	46.5	22.14	26.19	36.99	14.01
Kishanganj	55.46			31.02	42.8	18.49	22.22	33.12	10.38
Purnia	51.08			35.51	46.16	23.72	28.52	38.92	16.8
Katihar	52.24			35.29	45.51	24.03	28.7	39.24	16.88
Madhepura	52.25			36.19	48.87	22.31	27.72	39.31	14.41
Saharsa	53.2			39.28	52.04	25.31	29.98	42.37	15.83
Darbhanga	56.56			44.32	54.15	45.35	35.94	48.31	20.09
Muzaffarpur	63.43			48.15	82.19	87.2	74.11	48.44	22.33
Gopalganj	65.47			48.19	63.81	32.81	34.96	51.62	17.75
Siwan district	69.45			52.01	67.67	37.26	39.13	57.51	21.33
Saran	65.96			52.01	67.81	35.74	41.79	60.18	22.71
Vaishali	66.66			51.63	64	38.14	40.56	55.62	24.08
Samastipur	61.86			69.76	80.83	90.69	60.37	76.39	85.17
Begusarai	63.87			48.55	59.71	36.21	36.88	48.66	23.52
Khagaria	57.92			41.56	52.02	29.62	32.33	42.97	19.79
Bhagalpur	63.14			50.28	60.11	38.83	41.84	53.41	28.11
Banka	58.17			43.4	56.28	29.1	34.55	48.17	18.99
Munger	70.46			60.11	70.68	47.97	52.25	64.95	37.07
Lakhisarai	62.42			48.21	60.97	34.26	39.4	53.12	23.48
Sheikhpura	63.86			49.01	62.56	34.13	40.92	55.43	24.41
Nalanda	64.43			53.64	66.94	39.03	46.95	61.95	29.97
Patna	70.68			63.82	73.81	52.17	56.33	69.07	41.35
Bhojpur	70.47			59.71	74.78	42.81	48.18	66.35	27.95
Buxar	70.14			57.49	72.82	40.36	33.49	62.94	25.74
Kaimur	69.34			55.57	70.57	38.9	39.35	55.68	20.69
Rohtas	73.37			62.36	76.54	46.62	48.52	64.5	30.29
Jehanabad	66.8			56.03	70.9	40.08	45.83	63.11	26.81
Aurangabad	70.32			57.5	71.99	42.04	45.14	61.8	26.67
Gaya	63.67			61.07	73.81	47.4	50.47	65.22	34.2
Nawada	59.76			47.36	61.22	32.64	38.96	54.85	21.82
Jamui	59.79			42.74	57.1	26.92	33.41	48.48	16.41

== Key data ==
- Literacy
  - In Absolute Numbers - 5,96,75,607
    - Male - 3,99,78,955
    - Female - 1,97,96,652
  - Percentage of Total Population - 70.90%
    - Male - 79.70%
    - Female - 60.50%
  - Percentage of Urban Population - 83.1%
    - Male - 89.3%
    - Female - 75.9%
  - Percentage of Rural Population - 69.5%
    - Male - 78.6%
    - Female - 58.7%
  - Highest Literacy Rate
    - Rohtas - 75.59%
  - Lowest Literacy Rate
    - Purnia, 52.49%

== See also ==
- Education in Bihar
- Literacy in India
- Education in India
- Literacy
