= East Bengali refugees =

People who left East Bengal following the Partition of Bengal

East Bengali Refugees are people who left East Bengal following the Partition of Bengal, which was part of the Independence of India and Pakistan in 1947. An overwhelming majority of these refugees and immigrants were Bengali Hindus. During the Bangladesh liberation war with West Pakistan, an estimated ten million people of East Pakistan (present-day Bangladesh) fled the country and took refuge in India particularly in the Indian states of West Bengal and Indian North East region, especially Tripura and Assam.

== History ==
In 1947, Bengal was partitioned into the Indian state of West Bengal and the Pakistani province of East Bengal. East Bengal was later renamed East Pakistan, which subsequently broke away from Pakistan to form the independent country of Bangladesh. Most of Sylhet district in Assam also joined East Bengal and subsequently became part of East Pakistan. East Bengal was the area of agricultural growth whereas West Bengal was meant for industrial development.

== Settlement ==
The majority of East Bengali refugees settled in the city of Kolkata (Calcutta) and various other towns and rural areas of West Bengal, but a significant number also moved to the Barak Valley of Assam and the princely state of Tripura which eventually joined India in 1949. Around 0.5 million were also settled in other parts of India, including the East Pakistan Displaced Persons' Colony (EPDP) in Delhi (subsequently renamed Chittaranjan Park), Odisha, Madhya Pradesh, Bihar and Chhattisgarh. The estimated 0.5 million Bengalis in Delhi and 0.3 million in Mumbai are also largely East Bengali refugees and their descendants.

== Scope ==
The exact number of refugees has never been officially collected and estimates vary considerably.

In the immediate aftermath of partition, commonly attributed figures suggest around three million East Bengalis migrating to India and 864,000 migrants from India to East Pakistan. Indian government estimates suggest around 2.6 million migrants leaving East Bengal for India and 0.7 million migrants coming to East Pakistan from India.

As per the Refugee Relief and Rehabilitation Department of the Government of West Bengal, the census figures show the number of refugees from East Pakistan in 1971 was nearly 6 million and in 1981, the number was assessed at 8 million. A district-wise break-up in 1971, shows the main thrust of the refugee influx was on 24-Parganas (22.3% of the total refugees), Nadia (20.3%), Bankura (19.1%) and Kolkata (12.9%).

== Further migration ==
=== 1950s ===
In 1950, it is estimated that a further one million refugees crossed into West Bengal, particularly in the aftermath of 1950 Barisal riots and Noakhali riots. The 1951 Census of India recorded that 27% of Kolkata's population was East Bengali refugees mainly Hindu Bengalis and they contributed the economic growth of Kolkata in various fields. Millions of Hindus particularly Bengali speaking from East Pakistan took refuge in India's various states, mainly West Bengal. A number estimated that around 0.32 million Hindus from East Pakistan migrated mainly to Kolkata and various rural areas and towns of West Bengal during 1947.

=== 1960s ===
Migration continued, primarily from East Pakistan to India, right up to the liberation of Bangladesh in 1971, both on an ongoing basis and with spikes during periods of particular communal unrest such as the 1964 East Pakistan riots and the 1965 India-Pakistan War, when it is estimated that 600,000 refugees left for India. Estimates of the number of refugees up to 1970 are over five million to West Bengal alone. This includes around 4.1 million coming between 1946 and 1958 and 1.2 million coming between 1959 and 1971.

=== 1970s ===
Another major influx into India came in 1971 during the Bangladesh Liberation War, when Hindu refugees escaped systematic mass killings, rapes, lootings and arson. It is estimated that around ten million East Bengali refugees entered India during the early months of the war, of whom 1.5 million may have stayed back after Bangladesh became independent.

== See also ==
- Bangladesh–India relations
- Hinduism in Bangladesh
