= Nagar River (Rangpur) =

River in India and Bangladesh

Coordinates: 25°07′43″N 88°03′51″E

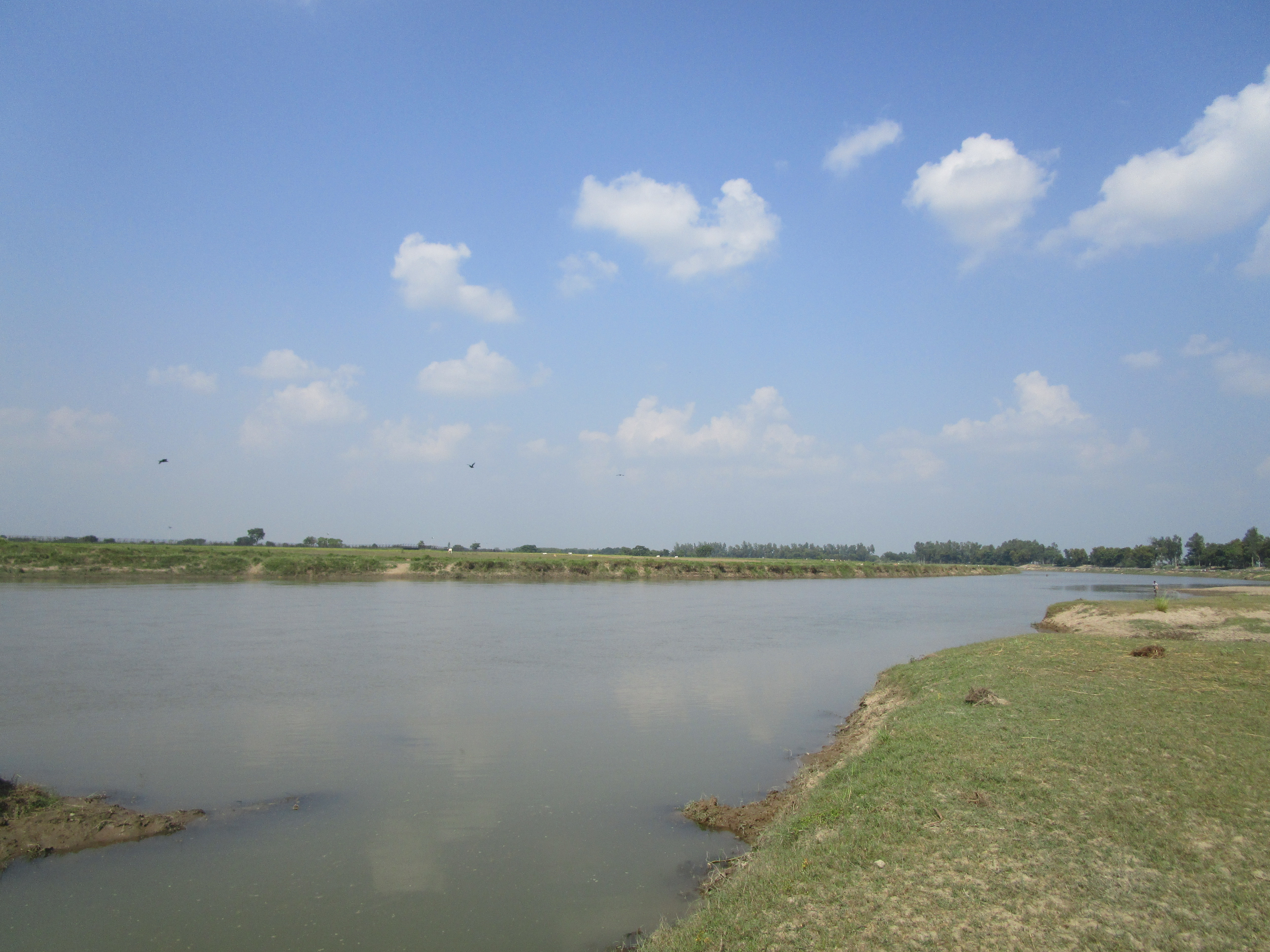
Nagor River in Uttar Dinajpur District in India

Nagar River (Bengali: নাগর নদ) forms parts of the international border between Bangladesh and India, between the state of Maharaja Hat in West Bengal and the districts of Panchagarh and Thakurgaon of Rangpur Division of Bangladesh. It is one of the important rivers of Haripur Upazila in Thakurgaon District. It is navigable by boats only in the rainy season.
