= Raiganj Lok Sabha constituency =

Lok Sabha Constituency in West Bengal, India

Coordinates: 25°37′N 88°07′E

Raiganj WB-5
- Lok Sabha constituency
- Interactive Map Outlining Raiganj Lok Sabha Constituency

Constituency details
- Country: India
- Region: East India
- State: West Bengal
- Assembly constituencies: Islampur; Goalpokhar; Chakulia; Karandighi; Hemtabad; Kaliaganj; Raiganj
- Established: 1962-present
- Total electors: 1,387,526
- Reservation: None

Member of Parliament
- 18th Lok Sabha
- Incumbent Kartick Chandra Paul
- Party: BJP
- Alliance: NDA
- Elected year: 2024

Raiganj Lok Sabha constituency is one of the 543 parliamentary constituencies in India. The constituency centres on Raiganj in West Bengal. All the seven assembly segments of No. 5 Raiganj Lok Sabha constituency are in Uttar Dinajpur district.

Most Successful parties from Raiganj Lok Sabha
1. Indian National Congress (10 times) (58.8%)
2. Communist Party of India (Marxist) (4 times) (23.5%)
3. Bharatiya Janata Party (2 times) (11.8%)
4. Janata Party(1 time) (5.89%)

== Assembly segments ==
Parliamentary constituencies in West Bengal - 1. Cooch Behar, 2. Alipurduars, 3. Jalpaiguri, 4. Darjeeling, 5. Raiganj, 6. Balurghat, 7. Maldaha Uttar, 8. Maldaha Dakshin, 9. Jangipur, 10. Baharampur, 11. Murshidabad, 12. Krishnanagar, 13. Ranaghat, 14. Bangaon, 15. Barrackpore, 16. Dum Dum, 17. Barasat, 18. Basirhat, 19. Jaynagar, 20. Mathurapur, 21. Diamond Harbour, 22. Jadavpur, 23. Kolkata Dakshin, 24. Kolkata Uttar, 25. Howrah, 26. Uluberia, 27. Serampore, 28. Hooghly, 29. Arambagh, 30. Tamluk, 31, Kanthi, 32. Ghatal, 33. Jhargram, 34. Medinipur, 35. Purulia, 36. Bankura, 37. Bishnupur, 38. Bardhaman Purba, 39. Bardhaman Durgapur, 40. Asansol, 41. Bolpur, 42. Birbhum

As per order of the Delimitation Commission in respect of the delimitation of constituencies in West Bengal, parliamentary constituency no. 5 Raiganj is composed of the following segments from 2009:

#	Name	District	Member	Party	2024 Lead
29	Islampur	Uttar Dinajpur	Kanaia Lal Agarwal	AITC	AITC
30	Goalpokhar	Uttar Dinajpur	Md. Ghulam Rabbani	AITC	AITC
31	Chakulia	Uttar Dinajpur	Minhajul Arfin Azad	AITC	INC
32	Karandighi	Uttar Dinajpur	Biraj Biswas	BJP	BJP
33	Hemtabad (SC)	Uttar Dinajpur	Haripada Barman	BJP	BJP
34	Kaliaganj (SC)	Uttar Dinajpur	Utpal Brahmacharo	BJP	BJP
35	Raiganj	Uttar Dinajpur	Koushik Chowdhury	BJP	BJP

== Members of Parliament ==
Year	Name	Party
1962	Chapala Kanta Bhattacharjee	Indian National Congress
1967	Chapala Kanta Bhattacharjee	Indian National Congress
1971	Siddharta Shankar Ray	Indian National Congress
1972^	Maya Ray	Indian National Congress
1977	Md. Hayat Ali	Bharatiya Lok Dal
1980	Golam Yazdani	Indian National Congress
1984	Golam Yazdani	Indian National Congress
1989	Golam Yazdani	Indian National Congress
1991	Subrata Mukherjee	Communist Party of India (Marxist)
1996	Subrata Mukherjee	Communist Party of India (Marxist)
1998	Subrata Mukherjee	Communist Party of India (Marxist)
1999	Priya Ranjan Dasmunsi	Indian National Congress
2004	Priya Ranjan Dasmunsi	Indian National Congress
2009	Deepa Dasmunsi	Indian National Congress
2014	Mohammed Salim	Communist Party of India (Marxist)
2019	Debasree Chaudhuri	Bharatiya Janata Party
2024	Kartick Chandra Paul	Bharatiya Janata Party

^ denotes by-elections

== Election results ==
Vote share of Winning candidates
2024	40.99%
2019	40.06%
2014	28.65%
2009	50.29%
2004	45.98%
1999	46.74%
1998	39.76%
1996	43.79%
1991	41.85%
1989	45.64%
1984	48.39%
1980	41.86%
1977	56.08%
1972 (by-poll)	93.30%
1971	49.55%
1967	26.96%
1962	42.51%

=== 2024 ===
2024 Indian general election: Raiganj
Party	Candidate	Votes	%	±%
BJP	Kartick Chandra Paul	560,897	40.99	▲0.93
AITC	Krishna Kalyani	492,700	36.00	▲0.68
INC	Ali Imran Ramz (Victor)	263,273	19.24	▲12.69
BSP	Swapan Kumar Das	4,117	0.30	
NOTA	None of the Above	1,940	0.14	▼0.94
IND	10 Independent Candidates	36,193	2.64	
OTH	6 Other Party Candidates	9,351	0.68	
Majority		68,197	4.99	▲0.25
Turnout		1,368,471	76.18	▼3.64
BJP hold		Swing		

=== 2019 ===
2019 Indian general election: Raiganj
Party	Candidate	Votes	%	±%
BJP	Debasree Chaudhuri	511,652	40.06	▲21.73
AITC	Kanaia Lal Agarwal	451,078	35.32	▲17.93
CPI(M)	Mohammed Salim	182,035	14.25	▼14.40
INC	Deepa Dasmunsi	83,662	6.55	▼21.95
NOTA	None of the Above	13,749	1.08	▲0.09
IND	5 Independent Candidates	20,151	1.58	
OTH	5 Other Party Candidates	14,782	1.16	
Majority		60,574	4.74	▲4.59
Turnout		1,278,076	79.82	▼0.05
BJP gain from CPI(M)		Swing		

=== 2014 ===
2014 Indian general election: Raiganj
Party	Candidate	Votes	%	±%
CPI(M)	Mohammed Salim	317,515	28.65	▼9.93
INC	Deepa Dasmunsi	315,881	28.50	▼21.79
BJP	Nimu Bhowmick	203,131	18.33	▲14.14
AITC	Satya Ranjan Dasmunshi	192,698	17.39	
SP	Sudiip Ranjan Sen	32,303	2.91	
NOTA	None of the Above	10,929	0.99	
SUCI	Dulal Rajbanshi	8,592	0.78	
BSP	Swapan Kumar Das	5,629	0.51	▼0.34
IND	Subrata Adhikary	5,548	0.50	
JDP	Bablu Soren	5,544	0.50	
AAP	Pasarul Alam	3,614	0.33	
AIUDF	Zameerul Hasan	3,471	0.31	
AMB	Nandakishor Singha	3,338	0.30	
Majority		1,634	0.15	▼11.56
Turnout		1,108,193	79.87	▼1.18
CPI(M) gain from INC		Swing		

=== 2009 ===
2009 Indian general election: Raiganj
Party	Candidate	Votes	%	±%
INC	Deepa Dasmunsi	451,776	50.29	▲4.31
CPI(M)	Bireswar Lahiri	346,573	38.58	▼3.13
BJP	Gopesh Chandra Sarkar	37,645	4.19	
IND	Abdul Karim Chowdhury (Note: Abdul Karim Chowdhary, contesting as an independent candidate, was a rebel Trinamool Congress Leader.)	18,427	2.05	
IND	Manas Jana	10,426	1.16	
RDMP	Faiz Rahaman	7,834	0.87	
BSP	Akhil Ranjan Mondal	7,592	0.85	▼0.37
CPI(ML)L	Suleman Hafiji	4,316	0.48	▼0.74
IND	Upendra Nath Das	4,157	0.46	
IND	Anil Biswas	3,844	0.43	
IND	Nachhir Ali Pramanik	3,212	0.36	
JD(U)	Matiur Rahman	2,597	0.29	
Majority		105,203	11.71	▲7.44
Turnout		898,399	81.05	
INC gain from CPI(M)		Swing		

=== 2004 ===
2004 Indian general election: Raiganj
Party	Candidate	Votes	%	±%
INC	Priya Ranjan Dasmunsi	421,904	45.98	▼0.76
CPI(M)	Minati Ghosh	382,757	41.71	▲3.56
AITC	Dr. Abedin Zainal	57,931	6.31	▼6.26
BSP	Anil Biswas	11,205	1.22	▲0.84
CPI(ML)L	Ajit Das	11,154	1.22	▲0.30
IND	Subrata Adhikary	9,914	1.08	
IND	Sukumal Biswas	9,624	1.05	
IND	Achintya Tarafdar	7,037	0.77	
SP	Ashis Saha	6,056	0.66	
Majority		39,147	4.27	▼4.32
Turnout		917,582		
INC hold		Swing		

=== 1999 ===
1999 Indian general election: Raiganj
Party	Candidate	Votes	%	±%
INC	Priya Ranjan Dasmunsi	409,331	46.74	▲7.69
CPI(M)	Subrata Mukherjee	334,076	38.15	▼1.61
AITC	Biplab Mitra	110,049	12.57	
NCP	Adhyapak Md. Salahuddin	8,386	0.96	
CPI(ML)L	Shri Ajit Das	8,093	0.92	▼0.04
BSP	Subhas Bala	3,332	0.38	▲0.06
IUML	Solaiman	2,449	0.28	
Majority		75,255	8.59	▲7.88
Turnout		885,408	77.35	▼2.41
INC gain from CPI(M)		Swing		

=== 1998 ===
1998 Indian general election: Raiganj
Party	Candidate	Votes	%	±%
CPI(M)	Subrata Mukherjee	350,897	39.76	▼4.03
INC	Priya Ranjan Dasmunsi	344,616	39.05	▼3.49
BJP	Rahul Sinha (Biswajit)	160,239	18.16	▲7.63
CPI(ML)L	Ajit Kumar Das	8,481	0.96	▼0.22
IND	Abedin Dr. Shayesta	6,582	0.75	
IND	Golam Yazdani	3,881	0.44	
BSP	Subhas Bala	2,812	0.32	
IND	Uday Dubey	1,218	0.14	
SJP(R)	Dr. Md. Salimuddin	1,167	0.13	
IND	Debasish Mitra	996	0.11	
IND	Md. Ilyas Choudhary	834	0.09	
IND	Adheswar Prasad Singha	765	0.09	
Majority		6,281	0.71	▼0.54
Turnout		898,301	79.76	▼1.39
CPI(M) hold		Swing		

=== 1996 ===
1996 Indian general election: Raiganj
Party	Candidate	Votes	%	±%
CPI(M)	Subrata Mukherjee	383,051	43.79	▲1.94
INC	Golam Yazdani	372,095	42.54	▲4.74
BJP	Utpalendu Sarkar	92,143	10.53	▼5.89
CPI(ML)L	Ramdas Mandal	10,292	1.18	
IND	Dhiren Das	5,989	0.68	
IND	Moqbul Hossain	4,234	0.48	
IND	Purna Sinha	2,819	0.32	
IND	Md. Salimuddin	1,790	0.20	
AMB	Sridam Thokdar	1,778	0.20	
IND	Mahendra Mahato	569	0.07	
Majority		10,956	1.25	▼2.80
Turnout		901,716	81.15	▲6.10
CPI(M) hold		Swing		

=== 1991 ===
1991 Indian general election: Raiganj
Party	Candidate	Votes	%	±%
CPI(M)	Subrata Mukherjee	310,167	41.85	▼3.40
INC	Golam Yazdani	280,199	37.80	▼7.84
BJP	Sudarshan Bhattacharya	121,717	16.42	▲10.92
IND	Ajit Kumar Das	7,877	1.06	
BSP	Anil Chandra Biswas	7,683	1.04	▲0.68
IUML	Maqbul Hossain	3,563	0.48	▼0.78
JP	Md. Salimuddin	3,367	0.45	▼0.59
IND	Dinesh Chandra Sinha	3,327	0.45	
IND	Mahato Mahendra Nath	1,532	0.21	
IND	Mahabir Prosad Agarwal	910	0.12	
IND	Rubiruddin	832	0.11	
Majority		29,968	4.05	▲3.66
Turnout		763,113	75.05	▼1.77
CPI(M) gain from INC		Swing		

=== 1989 ===
1989 Indian general election: Raiganj
Party	Candidate	Votes	%	±%
INC	Golam Yazdani	342,072	45.64	▼2.75
CPI(M)	Subrata Mukherjee	339,173	45.25	▲0.46
BJP	Arun Bhadra	41,197	5.50	▲2.66
IUML	Md. Maqbul Hussain	9,451	1.26	▲0.70
JP	Mahamuddin Ahamad	7,775	1.04	
IND	Abdul Latif Md.	5,241	0.70	
BSP	Anil Chandra Biswas	2,664	0.36	
AMB	Sridam Thokdar	1,915	0.26	
Majority		2,899	0.39	▼3.21
Turnout		763,803	76.82	▲1.95
INC hold		Swing		

=== 1984 ===
1984 Indian general election: Raiganj
Party	Candidate	Votes	%	±%
INC	Golam Yazdani	271,983	48.39	
CPI(M)	Subrata Mukherjee	251,759	44.79	▲3.21
BJP	Mohit Ranjan Sikdar	15,981	2.84	
IND	Ajit Kumar Das	12,051	2.14	
IUML	Mokbul Hossain	3,132	0.56	
IND	Gopalji Kedia	2,899	0.52	
IND	Bali Kanta Barman	2,810	0.50	
IND	Mohomodin Ahmed	1,485	0.26	
Majority		20,224	3.60	▲3.32
Turnout		574,536	74.87	▲5.26
INC gain from INC(I)		Swing		

=== 1980 ===
1980 Indian general election: Raiganj
Party	Candidate	Votes	%	±%
INC(I)	Golam Yazdani	196,241	41.86	
CPI(M)	Abdul Hafiz	194,936	41.58	
JP	Mohit Ranjan Sikdar	27,471	5.86	▼50.22
INC(U)	Abedin Zainal	21,990	4.69	
IND	Mohammed Elias Razi	13,554	2.89	
IND	Gopalji Kedia	8,871	1.89	
IND	Kamlala Kanta Singha	5,736	1.22	
Majority		1,305	0.28	▼19.67
Turnout		482,483	69.61	▲8.01
INC(I) gain from JP		Swing		

=== 1977 ===
1977 Indian general election: Raiganj
Party	Candidate	Votes	%	±%
JP	Md. Hayat Ali	188,694	56.08	
INC	Abedin Anowarul	121,570	36.13	▼57.17
IND	Nishitha Nath Kundu	26,212	7.79	
Majority		67,124	19.95	▼69.76
Turnout		347,199	61.60	
JP gain from INC		Swing		

=== 1972 by-election ===
A by-election was held in this constituency in 1972 which was necessitated by the resignation of sitting MP Siddhartha Shankar Ray and his subsequent election to the State Assembly from the Maldaha Assembly constituency. In the by-election, Maya Ray of Congress defeated his nearest rival S.K. Niyogi, a United Front-supported Independent Candidate, by 143,624 votes, thus breaking the record of Siddhartha Shankar Ray who had won the seat in 1971 by 64,007 votes.

Indian Parliamentary bye election, 1972: Raiganj constituency
Party	Candidate	Votes	%	±%
INC	Maya Ray	149,375	93.30	▲43.75
IND	S.K.Niyogi	5,751	3.59	
IND	Md. Salimuddin	4,979	3.11	
Majority		143,624	89.71	▲68.19
Turnout		1,60,105		
INC hold		Swing		

=== 1971 ===
1971 Indian general election: Raiganj
Party	Candidate	Votes	%	±%
INC	Siddhartha Shankar Ray	147,360	49.55	▲22.59
CPI(M)	Subodh Sen	83,353	28.03	
AIFB	Nirmal Kumar Basu	34,956	11.75	▼14.83
INC(O)	Muzaffar Hussain	18,962	6.38	
PSP	Md. Salimuddin	12,786	4.30	▼15.77
Majority		64,007	21.52	▲21.14
Turnout		311,567	54.83	▼1.84
INC hold		Swing		

=== 1967 ===
1967 Indian general election: Raiganj
Party	Candidate	Votes	%	±%
INC	Chapala Kanta Bhattacharjee	70,743	26.96	▼15.55
AIFB	N. K. Bose	69,753	26.58	
PSP	S. S. Hussain	52,674	20.07	▲2.85
SSP	R. P. Kumar	51,433	19.60	
IND	M. K. Chandra	17,810	6.79	
Majority		990	0.38	▼14.90
Turnout		276,115	56.67	▲12.78
INC hold		Swing		

=== 1962 ===
1962 Indian general election: Raiganj
Party	Candidate	Votes	%	±%
INC	Chapala Kanta Bhattacharjee	81,795	42.51	
CPI	Asoke Nath Sen	52,392	27.23	
PSP	Tripurari Chakravarti	33,139	17.22	
SWA	Ramnarayan Bhadra	18,114	9.41	
IND	Haridas Chakrabarty	6,992	3.63	
Majority		29,403	15.28	
Turnout		200,085	43.89	
INC win (new seat)				

== See also ==
- Raiganj
- List of constituencies of the Lok Sabha
