= Dasmunsi =

Dasmunsi is a surname. Notable people with the surname include:

- Deepa Dasmunsi (born 1960), Indian politician
- Priya Ranjan Dasmunsi (1945–2017), Indian politician
