= Tafazzal Hossain =

Indian politician

Janab Tafazzal Hossain
- তফজ্জল হোসেন

Member of West Bengal Legislative Assembly
- In office April 1951 – May 1957
- Preceded by: Office established
- Succeeded by: Golam Yazdani
- Constituency: Kharba

Personal details
- Born: Bengal Presidency
- Party: Indian National Congress
- Spouse: Mariam Bibi
- Children: Mahabubul Haque

Tafazzal Hossain (Bengali: তফজ্জল হোসেন) was an Indian Bengali Congress politician. He was an inaugural member of the West Bengal Legislative Assembly, representing the Kharba constituency.

== Early life and family ==
Tafazzal Hossain was born into a Bengali Muslim family from the village of Naikunda in Malda district, Bengal Presidency.

He married Mariam Bibi, and they had a son named Mahabubul Haque Badal on 31 July 1941. Haque won the Kharba seat in the 1972 West Bengal Legislative Assembly election.

== Career ==
Hossain won the Kharba constituency seat in the inaugural 1952 West Bengal Legislative Assembly election, standing as an Indian National Congress candidate.
