= Subrata Mukherjee (CPM politician) =

Indian politician

Member of Parliament, Lok Sabha
- In office 1991–1999
- Preceded by: Golam Yazdani
- Succeeded by: Priyaranjan Dasmunsi
- Constituency: Raiganj

Personal details
- Born: 12 October 1942 (age 83)
- Party: Communist Party of India (Marxist)

Subrata Mukherjee (born 12 October 1942, in Dalkhola, West Dinajpur district, (West Bengal)) is a leader of Communist Party of India (Marxist) from West Bengal. He served as member of the Lok Sabha representing Raiganj (Lok Sabha constituency). He was elected to 10th, 11th, 12th and 13th Lok Sabha.
