= Ali Imran Ramz =

Indian politician

Ali Imran Ramz (Victor)

Member of the West Bengal Legislative Assembly
- In office 13 May 2011 – 2 May 2021
- Preceded by: constituency created
- Succeeded by: Minhajul Arfin Azad
- Constituency: Chakulia
- In office 10 November 2009 – 13 May 2011
- Preceded by: Deepa Dasmunsi
- Succeeded by: Mohammad Ghulam Rabbani
- Constituency: Goalpokhar

Personal details
- Born: 2 October 1979 (age 47) Chakulia, Uttar Dinajpur, West Bengal
- Party: Indian National Congress (2022— 2026); Azad Hind Manch (June 2022 — October 2022); All India Forward Bloc (1997 — 2022)
- Parent: Md. Ramjan Ali (father)
- Education: University of Calcutta Jogesh Chandra Chaudhuri Law College
- Nickname: Victor

Ali Imran Ramz (born 5 October 1972), popularly known as Victor, is an Indian politician who was elected to the West Bengal Legislative Assembly in the 2009 by-election and the 2019 election.

He is son of late Mohammad Ramzan Ali, a Forward Bloc leader and four-term Member of West Bengal Legislative Assembly from Goalpokhar. Ramz's uncle, Hafiz Alam Sairani, was a three-time MLA and former Minister of West Bengal who also represented the same constituency.

== Political career ==
Ramz was first elected from Goalpokhar in a by-election in 2009 and subsequently re-elected from the newly created Chakulia constituency in 2011. On 17 October 2022, he joined Indian National Congress in the presence of West Bengal Pradesh Congress Committee President Adhir Ranjan Chowdhury at WBPCC headquarters, Bidhan Bhawan.

== Electoral History ==
=== Legislative Assembly ===
Year	Constituency	Party	Votes	%	Opponent	Party	Votes	%	Result	Margin	%
2026	Chakulia	INC	40,346	20.26	Azad Minhajul Arfin	TMC	90,277	45.34	Lost	-49,931	-25.08
2021	Chakulia	AIFB	28,704	16.55	Azad Minhajul Arfin	TMC	86,311	49.78	Lost	-57,607	-33.23
2016	Chakulia	AIFB	64,185	42.65	Ashim Kumar Mridha	BJP	36,656	24.36	Won	+27,529	+18.29
2011	Chakulia	AIFB	65,265	52.13	Serajul Islam	INC	44,852	35.82	Won	+20,413	+16.31
2009 (Note: By-Election)	Goalpokhar	AIFB	72,017	76.74	Md. Ghulam Rabbani	INC	57,299	23.26	Won	+14,718	+53.48

=== Lok Sabha ===
Year	Constituency	Party	Votes	%	Opponent	Party	Votes	%	Result	Margin	%
2024	Raiganj	INC	2,63,273	19.24	Kartick Chandra Paul	BJP	5,60,897	40.99	Lost	-2,97,624	-21.75
