= Islampur, West Bengal Assembly constituency =

Islampur
- Constituency No. 29 for the West Bengal Legislative Assembly
- Interactive Map Outlining Islampur Assembly Constituency

Constituency details
- Country: India
- Region: East India
- State: West Bengal
- District: Uttar Dinajpur
- Lok Sabha constituency: Raiganj
- Established: 1957
- Total electors: 202,385
- Reservation: None

Member of Legislative Assembly
- 18th West Bengal Legislative Assembly
- Incumbent Kanaia Lal Agarwal
- Party: Mamata All India Trinamool Congress
- Elected year: 2026

Most Successful parties from Islampur assembly
1. Indian National Congress (10 times) (55.6%)
2. All India Trinamool Congress (5 times) (27.8%)
3. Communist Party of India (Marxist) (2 times) (11.1%)
4. Independent (1 time) (5.55%)

Islampur Assembly constituency is an assembly constituency in Uttar Dinajpur district in the Indian state of West Bengal.

== Overview ==
As per orders of the Delimitation Commission, No. 29 Islampur Assembly constituency covers Islampur municipality, and Agdimti Khanti, Gaisal I, Gaisal II, Gunjaria, Islampur, Matikunda I, Matikunda II, Panditpota I, Panditpota II, Ramganj I and Ramganj II gram panchayats of Islampur community development block.

Islampur Assembly constituency is part of No. 5 Raiganj (Lok Sabha constituency). It was earlier part of Darjeeling (Lok Sabha constituency)

== Members of the Legislative Assembly ==
Year	MLA	Party
Islampur constituency
1957	Mohd. Afaque Choudhury	Indian National Congress
1962	Mohd. Afaque Choudhury	Indian National Congress
1967	Abdul Karim Chowdhury	Indian National Congress
1969	Abdul Karim Chowdhury	Indian National Congress
1971	Abdul Karim Chowdhury	Indian National Congress
1972	Abdul Karim Chowdhury	Indian National Congress
1977	Abdul Karim Chowdhury	Independent
1982	Abdul Karim Chowdhury	Indian National Congress
1987	Md. Faruque Azam	Communist Party of India (Marxist)
1991	Abdul Karim Chowdhury	Indian National Congress
1996	Abdul Karim Chowdhury	Indian National Congress
2001	Abdul Karim Chowdhury	Trinamool Congress
2006	Md. Faruque Azam	Communist Party of India (Marxist)
2011	Abdul Karim Chowdhury	Trinamool Congress
2016	Kanaia Lal Agarwal	Indian National Congress
2019^	Abdul Karim Chowdhury	Trinamool Congress
2021	Abdul Karim Chowdhury	Trinamool Congress
2026	Kanaia Lal Agarwal	Trinamool Congress

^By Election

== Election results ==
=== 2026 ===
In the 2026 West Bengal Legislative Assembly election, Kanaia Lal Agarwal of TMC defeated his nearest rival Chitrajit Roy of BJP by 40,063 votes.

2026 West Bengal Legislative Assembly election: Islampur
Party	Candidate	Votes	%	±%
AITC	Agarwal Kanaia Lal	108,117	58.14	▼0.77
BJP	Chitrajit Roy	68,054	36.6	▼0.28
CPI(M)	Md. Sami Khan	4,237	2.28	
NOTA	None of the above	2,020	1.09	▼0.07
INC	Guddy Riaz	1,391	0.75	▼1.29
Majority		40,063	21.54	▼0.49
Turnout		185,961	91.88	▲14.52
AITC hold		Swing	0.24	

=== 2021 ===
2021 West Bengal Legislative Assembly election: Islampur
Party	Candidate	Votes	%	±%
AITC	Abdul Karim Chowdhary	100,131	58.91	
BJP	Dr. Saumyaroop Mandal	62,691	36.88	
INC	Sadikul Islam	3,461	2.04	
NOTA	None of the above	1,976	1.16	
Majority		37,440	22.03	
Turnout		169,974	77.36	
AITC hold		Swing		

=== 2019 bypoll ===
2019 West Bengal Legislative Assembly by-election: Islampur
Party	Candidate	Votes	%	±%
AITC	Abdul Karim Chowdhury	77,528	53.08	+14.37
BJP	Dr. Saumyaroop Mandal	56,141	38.44	+25.95
INC	Muzaffar Hussain	5,208	3.57	−40.31
CPI(M)	Shantiprokash Guhaneogi	5,128	3.51	N/A
Indian Democratic People's Party	Dr. Md. Tabibur Rahman	652	0.45	N/A
NOTA	None of the above	1,391	0.95	−0.35
Majority		21,387	14.64	
Turnout		1,46,048		
Registered electors				
AITC gain from INC		Swing		

=== 2016 ===
2016 West Bengal Legislative Assembly election: Islampur constituency
Party	Candidate	Votes	%	±%
INC	Kanaia Lal Agarwal	65,559	43.88	
AITC	Abdul Karim Chowdhury	57,841	38.71	
BJP	Saumyaroop Mandal	18,668	12.49	
JD(U)	Md Arsad	1,521	1.01	
BSP	Sefali Roy Mondal	1,164	0.78	
GJM	Altamas Choudhury	1,069	0.71	
SP	Abdus Subhan	923	0.62	
SUCI(C)	Dayal Singha	716	0.48	
NOTA	None of the Above	1,943	1.30	
Majority		7,718	5.17	
Turnout		1,49,404	79.36	
Registered electors		1,88,269		
INC gain from AITC		Swing		

=== 2011 ===
In the 2011 election, Abdul Karim Chowdhury of Trinamool Congress defeated his nearest rival Sayeda Farhat Afroz of CPI(M).

West Bengal assembly elections, 2011: Islampur constituency
Party	Candidate	Votes	%	±%
AITC	Abdul Karim Chowdhury	49,326	41.48	+2.34#
CPI(M)	Sayeda Farhat Afroz	38,054	32.00	−13.21
Independent	Kanaia Lal Agarwal	20,870	17.55	
BJP	Nepal Dutta	5,772	4.85	
Independent	Md. Nadeem Akhter	2,941		
BSP	Umar Ali	1,944		
Turnout		118,907	79.28	
AITC gain from CPI(M)		Swing	15.55#	

Kanaia Lal Agarwal, Chairman of Islampur municipality, run by the Congress, was the rebel Congress candidate who contested as an independent from Islampur. He was suspended from the party but the Raiganj MP, Deepa Dasmunsi, campaigned for him.

.# Swing calculated on Trinamool Congress and CPI(M) vote percentages, as there was a rebel Congress candidate.

=== 2006 ===
In the 2006 state assembly elections, Md. Faruque of CPI(M) won the Islampur assembly constituency defeating his nearest rival Abdul Karim Chowdhary of Trinamool Congress. Contests in most years were multi cornered but only winners and runners are being mentioned. Abdul Karim Chowdhary representing Trinamool Congress in 2001 and Congress in 1996 and 1991 defeated Md. Faruque Azam of CPI(M). Md. Faruque Azam of CPI(M) defeated Abdul Karim Chowdhary of Congress in 1987. Abdul Karim Chowdhary of Congress/ Independent defeated Md. Faiukazam of CPI(M) in 1982 and Goutam Gupta, Independent, in 1977.

=== 1951 ===
Although Islampur constituency was formed in West Bengal in 1977, it was a constituency in independent India's first election in 1951, when the area was part of Bihar. Chowdhary Mohamad Afaque of Congress won the Islampur seat in 1951.

== See also ==
- Bengali language Movement (North Dinajpur)
