= Siddhartha Shankar Ray =

Indian politician and lawyer (1920–2010)

5th Chief Minister of West Bengal
- In office 20 March 1972 – 30 April 1977
- Preceded by: President's rule
- Succeeded by: President's rule

Indian Ambassador to the United States
- In office 1992–1996
- Prime Minister: P. V. Narasimha Rao
- Preceded by: Abid Hussain
- Succeeded by: Naresh Chandra

Member of Parliament, Lok Sabha
- In office 18 March 1971 – 20 March 1972
- Preceded by: Chapala Kanta Bhattacharjee
- Succeeded by: Maya Ray
- Constituency: Raiganj

Union Minister of Education
- In office 18 March 1971 – 20 March 1972
- Prime Minister: Indira Gandhi
- Preceded by: V. K. R. V. Rao
- Succeeded by: Saiyid Nurul Hasan

Governor of Punjab Administrator of Chandigarh
- In office 2 April 1986 – 8 December 1989
- Chief Minister: Surjit Singh Barnala; President's rule
- Preceded by: Shankar Dayal Sharma
- Succeeded by: Nirmal Mukarji

Leader of Opposition, West Bengal Legislative Assembly
- In office 1969–1971
- Preceded by: Khagendra Nath Dasgupta
- Succeeded by: Prafulla Chandra Sen

Member of West Bengal Legislative Assembly
- In office 1991–1992
- Preceded by: Debiprasad Chattopadhyaya
- Succeeded by: Anil Chatterjee
- Constituency: Chowranghee
- In office 1972–1977
- Preceded by: Mahammad Gafurur Rahman
- Succeeded by: Shubhendu Chowdhury
- Constituency: Maldaha
- In office 1967–1971
- Preceded by: Bidhan Chandra Roy
- Succeeded by: Shankar Ghosh
- Constituency: Chowranghee
- In office 1957–1967
- Preceded by: Mira Datta Gupta
- Succeeded by: Constituency abolished
- Constituency: Bhabanipur

Personal details
- Born: 20 October 1920 Calcutta, Bengal Presidency, British India
- Died: 6 November 2010 (aged 90) Kolkata, West Bengal, India
- Cause of death: Kidney failure
- Party: Indian National Congress
- Height: 6 ft 4 in (193 cm)
- Spouse: Maya Ray
- Education: Presidency University, Kolkata; Inner Temple (Barrister-at-Law)
- Profession: Lawyer, Politician, Diplomat

Siddhartha Shankar Ray (20 October 1920 – 6 November 2010) was an Indian lawyer, diplomat, politician and statesman who served as chief minister of West Bengal between 1972 and 1977.

An active member of the Indian National Congress since his youth, Ray was elected member of the Legislative Assembly for Bhowanipore in 1957. Briefly a member of the West Bengal cabinet, Ray resigned his ministerial offices and left the Congress, citing differences, before rejoining the party in 1967. He sided with Indira Gandhi's faction following the Congress split in 1969 and became its leader of the opposition in the state assembly until his election to Parliament in 1971. Ray briefly served as union minister of education in the third Gandhi ministry, before becoming chief minister in 1972.

Ray's legacy as chief minister is highly divisive; he is considered complicit in the Emergency, and his own tenure is described as markedly authoritarian, owing to a massive political and police crackdown on the Naxalite–Maoist insurgency and political opposition in West Bengal. However, Ray is also known for his heavy-handed approach to political corruption, going as far as to institute a commission to investigate corruption in his own government, which resulted in his sacking of several ministers in 1975. Ray was instrumental in the state's panchayat reforms, which went on to inspire similar such reforms nationwide. His government was marked by relative economic and infrastructural development, with the construction of the Kolkata Metro beginning in 1972 and West Bengal's industrial production mounting an upwards recovery during his tenure.

Ray chose not to run for office again in 1977, and his party suffered a landslide defeat to the Communist Party of India (Marxist) in that year's assembly elections. Sidelined by Indira Gandhi following the Emergency, he attempted a return to the Legislative Assembly in 1985, but his unpopularity amongst the state Congress cadre proved his efforts futile. Appointed governor of Punjab the following year, the police under Ray were also accused of excesses when the state was placed under President's rule in 1987; he resigned after the 1989 Lok Sabha elections. Ray returned to the Legislative Assembly for a brief period between 1991 and 1992, before his appointment as ambassador to the United States under the Rao ministry.

Resigning his ambassadorship in 1996, Ray stood unsuccessfully for Parliament in 1999 and retired from active politics soon afterwards. He died in 2010, aged 90.

== Biography ==
Ray was born in a Bengali Kayastha family. Ray's father, Sudhir Kumar Ray, was a well-known barrister of Calcutta High Court and a member of the Indian National Congress and his mother Aparna Devi, was the elder daughter of the barrister and nationalist leader Chittaranjan Das and Basanti Devi grew up in England. Ray's sister is Justice Manjula Bose (1930–2016) who was a senior judge of the Calcutta High Court; along with Padma Khastagir, she was one of the first female judges of the Calcutta High Court. Ray was also related to Sudhi Ranjan Das, a former Chief Justice of India and Satish Ranjan Das, a former Advocate General of Bengal and a Law Member of the Viceroy's Executive Council.

Ray studied at, Mitra Institution, Bhowanipore Branch, Calcutta, Presidency College, Calcutta and University Law College, of the University of Calcutta. In college and university, he was active in both sports and politics. In 1941, he was elected as student Under-Secretary in the Calcutta University Institute Elections and was put in charge from time to time of various departments including Students' Aid Fund, Debates, Sports and Socials. He was also the Debate Secretary and later the General Secretary of the Calcutta University Law College Union. As a sportsman he captained the Presidency College cricket team. He was the captain of the team that won the Inter Collegiate cricket Championship in 1944. He had scored three double centuries and 1000 runs for three consecutive seasons. He was also a keen footballer in Calcutta playing for the Kalighat Club. He was a University Blue in this sport and represented the Calcutta University in inter-varsity matches. In 1939, he was the captain of the victorious Presidency College football team which won both the Elliot and Hardinge Birthday Shields. He was also interested in lawn tennis and table tennis.

Later Ray was called to the bar by the Honourable Society of Inner Temple, London, in 1947. While in London he played cricket for the Indian Gymkhana Club.

== Career ==
Upon his return from England in 1946, Ray joined the Calcutta Bar as a junior of Justice Ramaprasad Mukherjee, who later became a Judge and Chief Justice (Acting) of the High Court of Calcutta. In 1954 he became one of the three junior Central Government counsels in Calcutta.

In 1957 he was elected as an MLA from Bhowanipore which he won by a large majority, becoming the youngest member of the West Bengal Cabinet under the leadership of Dr. Bidhan Chandra Roy. He was appointed Minister of Law & Tribal Welfare. However, after one year, he resigned from his ministerial portfolios and Congress party membership, citing differences with Dr. Bidhan Chandra Roy. In 1962, he was re-elected from the Bhowanipore seat as an Independent MLA. In 1967 he rejoined the Congress party & was elected as an MLA from Chowranghee that year, which he retained in the next state election. When the Congress split in 1969, Ray sided with Indira Gandhi's faction. From 1969 to 1971, he was the Leader of Opposition in the State Legislative Assembly during the Second United Front Government. In the 1971 Indian general election, he won the Raiganj seat and became the Union Cabinet Minister of Education & Youth Services under Indira Gandhi. He was also the Union Cabinet Minister of West Bengal & Bangladesh Affairs and was actively involved with the matters of the Bangladesh Liberation War.

After the Congress(R) won the assembly election of 1972, he became the Chief Minister of West Bengal from 20 March 1972 to 30 April 1977 after being elected from the Maldaha seat in a bypoll. His administration was faced with the massive problem of resettling over a million refugees from East Pakistan fleeing war and the campaign of genocide of Bengalis launched by the Pakistani military in various parts of the state. He also undersaw the crackdown on Maoist insurgents in the state. His rule was characterised by widespread political violence against supporters of CPI(ML) (which consisted of mostly students studying in colleges and universities) and other Communist parties, which often involved political murders and extra-judicial killings by the state police force. Under Section 47(c) of the Calcutta Municipal Act of 1951 Ray had the Governor let the Calcutta Municipal Corporation be superseded by the state government, effectively dissolving the Communist-led mayoral council of Calcutta from 22 March 1972. No further election to the post of mayor was held during his tenure. Ray was instrumental in passing the West Bengal Panchayat Act of 1973, which changed the pre-existing 4-tier panchayat system into the current 3-tier panchayat system. This system was implemented nationally as the 73rd Amendment to the Constitution of India in 1992. The West Bengal Panchayat Act of 1973 was one of his biggest achievements. However, he refused to hold election to the panchayats out of fear of Naxalites and Communists escalating violence in rural areas. Ray had also instituted a commission headed by K. N. Wanchoo to investigate corruption allegations against his own Cabinet ministers and had even sacked his own Power Minister Suniti Chattaraj for accepting bribes. During his tenure, a new Water Treatment Plant was set up at Garden Reach in South Kolkata and construction for the Kolkata Metro began.

After the Congress(R) lost the next elections in the state to the CPI(M)-led alliance of Communist parties, Ray was widely blamed for Congress' electoral defeat in the state. As Ray had stood against her nominated candidate Kasu Brahmananda Reddy in the polls for the party's president in 1978, Indira Gandhi sidelined Ray from the party after coming back to power in 1980. From 1982, he served as the head of the Cricket Association of Bengal until 1986. After Indira Gandhi's murder, Ray tried to return to state politics by standing against veteran Communist leader Somnath Chatterjee as the Congress(I) candidate in bypolls to the Bolpur seat in 1985, but his unpopularity and enmity with a section of state Congress leaders caused him to lose by a margin of around 1 lakh votes.

Prime Minister Rajiv Gandhi appointed Ray as the Governor of Punjab from 2 April 1986 where he played a pro-active role in suppressing Sikh insurgents, however there too he was accused of conducting police brutalities while the state was under President's rule. Ray was removed as Governor on 8 December 1989 by Prime Minister V. P. Singh for the former's insistence to use violence for neutralising AISSF general secretary Harminder Singh Sandhu.

Following the collapse of the USSR, India's longtime strategic partner, Ray was sent by Prime Minister P. V. Narasimha Rao as Ambassador of India to the United States to thaw bilateral relations with the country that had been hostile towards India throughout the Cold War. He remained in the United States from 1992 to 1996. Prior to that, he was the Leader of Opposition in the state Legislative Assembly from 1991 to 1992, having been elected from the Chowranghee seat. In 1995, it was rumoured that Ray might return to contest the upcoming state elections, but it didn't happen due to opposition from the state Congress unit. Ray contested his last election as the Congress candidate for the North West Calcutta seat in the 1999 Indian general election, in which came third.

=== Role in the Emergency ===
Siddhartha Shankar Ray had a major role in the imposition of The Emergency from 1975 to 1977. He proposed to the prime minister Indira Gandhi to impose an "internal emergency" and also drafted the letter for the President Fakhruddin Ali Ahmed to issue the proclamation and showed her how democratic freedoms could be suspended while remaining within the ambit of the Constitution.

== Retirement ==
After his retirement in 1996 till 2010, Ray returned to his law practice as a Barrister of the Calcutta High Court.

Ray continued to remain close with his protégé Mamata Banerjee, even after she left the Congress and formed her separate party.

Ray died of kidney failure on 6 November 2010 at the age of 90. The CPI(M)-led Left Front government of the state was criticised by the Congress for not according full state honours to Ray as it did to Ray's arch-nemesis Jyoti Basu, who died 9 months before.

== Legacy ==
A philanthropic society named "Siddhartha Shankar Ray Foundation" was formed by Mr. Rajesh Chirimar in memory of Ray with the due consent of Maya Ray. The society engages in various social activities and will be celebrating the Birth Centenary Year of Shri Siddhartha Shankar Ray.

Political offices
Preceded by V.K.R.V. Rao	Education Minister, Government of India; 1967–1972	Succeeded by S. Nurul Hasan
Preceded by Ajoy Kumar Mukherjee	Chief Minister of West Bengal; 1972–1977	Succeeded by Jyoti Basu
Preceded by Shankar Dayal Sharma	Governor of Punjab; 1986–1989	Succeeded by Nirmal Kumar Mukarji
Preceded by Abid Hussain	Indian Ambassador to the United States; 1992–1996	Succeeded by Naresh Chandra
