= Susanta Chakraborty =

Indian politician (1940–2002)

Member of Parliament, Lok Sabha
- In office 1989-1996
- Preceded by: Priyaranjan Dasmunsi
- Succeeded by: Priyaranjan Dasmunsi
- Constituency: Howrah, West Bengal

Personal details
- Born: 1 September 1940 Bhairabpur, Hooghly District, Bengal Presidency, British India
- Died: 9 September 2002 (aged 62) Rafiganj, Bihar
- Party: Communist Party of India (Marxist)
- Spouse: Sukla Chakraborty
- Children: 1 daughters

Susanta Chakraborty (1 September 1940 - 9 September 2002) was an Indian politician. He was elected to the Lok Sabha, lower house of the Parliament of India from Howrah, West Bengal in 1989 and 1991 as a member of the Communist Party of India (Marxist).
