= Azad Hind Manch =

- Founded: 21 June 2022
- Dissolved: 18 October 2022
- Split from: All India Forward Bloc
- Merged into: Indian National Congress and Communist Party of India (Marxist)
- Headquarters: Prashant Dasgupta Bhavan; Garia, Kolkata 700084
- Ideology: Marxism; Scientific Socialism
- Political position: Left-wing

Azad Hind Manch (transl. Free Indian Platform) was an organization of rebels from the Forward Bloc who have resigned or been expelled from the party for questioning the "undemocratic functioning" and ideological deviations of the leadership. On 21 June 2022, the Azad Hind Manch was formed under the leadership of Ali Imran Ramz and other rebels.

"The red flag with the image of a leaping tiger with a hammer and sickle is the original flag" is which they will carry forward. They have called for an ideological struggle against the "imposition" of the absurd doctrine of "Subhasvad" on the party workers.

== Activities ==
- On 22 June, when the Forward Bloc called for the hoisting of the new flag, rebels celebrated the foundation day of the AIFB with the original flag in about 10 districts of the state.
- On 25 June, a civil protest march called by the Left Front in Calcutta demanding the release of Teesta Setalvad did not show any front-line leaders of the Forward Bloc, but the 'Azad Hind Manch' of rebels led by Ali Imran Ramz (Victor) arrived there to join it. Victor told Biman Bose that they want to continue with the Left Front.
- On 22 July, they held a memorial meeting for Dr. Barun Mukherji who died on 10 July at Bharat Sabha Hall. AHM leader Sudip Banerjee said "We think there are two main reasons behind the formation of Azad Hind Manch. First, integrity of leadership and second, ideals. Dr. Barun Mukherjee is our leader in both these matters. His integrity is unquestionable. Which today's leadership does not even have a drop."
- On 29 July, although earlier Azad Hind Manch meetings were held in various districts, the first meeting was held at the district office of the Forward Bloc in Chakulia, the base of rebel leader Victor.
- On 30 July, AHM participated in the 'Chor Dharo Jail Bharo' program with the CPIM in Chankulia.
- On 12 September, under the banner of the Bankura Area Committee, the Communist Party of India (Marxist) along with the Azad Hind Manch organized a joint anti-corruption deputation in the panchayat with massive crowds.
