= Md. Ramjan Ali =

Indian politician

MLA of Goalpokhar Vidhan Sabha Constituency
- In office 1977–1994
- Preceded by: Sheikh Sharafat Hussain
- Succeeded by: Hafiz Alam Sairani

Personal details
- Died: 1994 MLA Hostel, Kolkata, West Bengal, India
- Party: All India Forward Bloc

Md. Ramjan Ali was an Indian politician. He was elected as MLA of Goalpokhar Vidhan Sabha Constituency in West Bengal Legislative Assembly in 1977, 1982, 1987 and 1991. He was murdered in 1994 in MLA Hostel of Kolkata. His son Ali Imran Ramz was elected thrice as a member of West Bengal Legislative Assembly.
