= Chakulia Assembly constituency =

Chakulia
- Constituency No. 31 for the West Bengal Legislative Assembly
- Interactive Map Outlining Chakulia Assembly Constituency

Constituency details
- Country: India
- Region: East India
- State: West Bengal
- District: Uttar Dinajpur
- Lok Sabha constituency: Raiganj
- Established: 2011
- Total electors: 216,163
- Reservation: None

Member of Legislative Assembly
- 18th West Bengal Legislative Assembly
- Incumbent Azad Minhajul Arfin
- Party: All India Trinamool Congress
- Elected year: 2026

Chakulia Assembly constituency is an assembly constituency in Uttar Dinajpur district in the Indian state of West Bengal.

== Overview ==
As per orders of the Delimitation Commission, No. 31 Chakulia Assembly constituency covers Goalpokhar II community development block (CBD) and Bazargaon I and Bazargaon II gram panchayats of Karandighi CBD.

Chakulia Assembly constituency is part of No. 5. Raiganj (Lok Sabha constituency).

== Members of the Legislative Assembly ==
Election	Member	Party
2011	Ali Imran Ramz	All India Forward Bloc
2016	Ali Imran Ramz	All India Forward Bloc
2021	Azad Minhajul Arfin	All India Trinamool Congress
2026	Azad Minhajul Arfin	All India Trinamool Congress

== Election results ==
=== 2026 ===
2026 West Bengal Legislative Assembly election: Chakulia
Party	Candidate	Votes	%	±%
AITC	Azad Minhajul Arfin	90,277	45.34	▼4.44
BJP	Manoj Kumar Jain	62,266	31.27	▲1.01
INC	Ali Imran Ramz (Victor)	40,346	20.26	▼15.56
NOTA	None of the above	1,724	0.87	▲0.19
Majority		28,011	14.07	▼5.45
Turnout		199,125	92.12	▲17.82
AITC hold		Swing	4.44	

=== 2021 ===
2021 West Bengal Legislative Assembly election: Chakulia
Party	Candidate	Votes	%	±%
AITC	Azad Minhajul Arfin	86,311	49.78	
BJP	Sachin Prasad	52,474	30.26	
AIFB	Ali Imran Ramz (Victor)	28,704	16.55	
BSP	Goutam Paul	2,725	1.57	
NOTA	None of the above	1,186	0.68	
Majority		33,837	19.52	
Turnout		173,400	74.3	
AITC gain from AIFB		Swing		

=== 2016 ===
In the 2016 election, Ali Imran Ramz (Victor) of AIFB defeated his nearest rival Ashim Kumar Mridha of BJP.

West Bengal assembly elections, 2016: Chakulia constituency
Party	Candidate	Votes	%	±%
AIFB	Ali Imran Ramz (Victor)	64,185	42.65	−9.48
BJP	Ashim Kumar Mridha	36,656	24.36	+21.12
AITC	Alema Noorie	36,198	24.05	
BSP	Goutam Chandra Paul	8,719	5.79	+1.57
SP	Mir Masud Alam	1,839	1.22	
NOTA	None of the above	1,613	1.07	+1.07
Independent	Rafikul Alam	1,290	0.86	
Turnout		1,50,500	75.22	+0.25
AIFB hold		Swing		

Note- Indian National Congress supported the All India Forward Bloc candidate Ali Imran Ramz (Victor) in 2016.

=== 2011 ===
In the 2011 election, Ali Imran Ramz of AIFB defeated his nearest rival Serajul Islam of Congress.

West Bengal assembly elections, 2011: Chakulia constituency
Party	Candidate	Votes	%	±%
AIFB	Ali Imran Ramz (Victor)	65,265	52.13	
INC	Serajul Islam	44,852	35.82	
BSP	Goutam Chandra Paul	5,287	4.22	
BJP	Kalipada Ghosh	4,052	3.24	
JDP	Durga Hemram	3,081		
Independent	Raj Kumar Jain	2,661		
Turnout		125,198	74.97	
AIFB win (new seat)				
