= Goalpokhar Assembly constituency =

Goalpokhar
- Constituency No. 30 for the West Bengal Legislative Assembly
- Interactive Map Outlining Goalpokhar Assembly Constituency

Constituency details
- Country: India
- Region: East India
- State: West Bengal
- District: Uttar Dinajpur
- Lok Sabha constituency: Raiganj
- Established: 1957
- Total electors: 199,566
- Reservation: None

Member of Legislative Assembly
- 18th West Bengal Legislative Assembly
- Incumbent Md Ghulam Rabbani
- Party: Mamata All India Trinamool Congress
- Elected year: 2026

Most Successful parties from Goalpokhar assembly
1. All India Forward Bloc (7 times) (38.9%)
2. Indian National Congress (5 times) (27.8%)
3. Praja Socialist Party (3 times) (16.7%)
4. All India Trinamool Congress (3 times) (16.7%)

Goalpokhar Assembly constituency is an assembly constituency in Uttar Dinajpur district in the Indian state of West Bengal.

== Overview ==
As per orders of the Delimitation Commission, No. 30 Goalpokhar Assembly constituency covers Goalpokhar I community development block.

Goalpokhar Assembly constituency is part of No. 5 Raiganj (Lok Sabha constituency).

== Members of the Legislative Assembly ==
Election Year	MLA	Party
**Goalpokhar constituency**
1957	**Muzaffar Hussain**	Indian National Congress
1962	**Mohammad Hayat Ali**	Praja Socialist Party
1967	**Mohammad Salimuddin**	Praja Socialist Party
1969	**Mohammad Salimuddin**	Praja Socialist Party
1971	Sheikh Sharafat Hossain	Indian National Congress
1972	Sheikh Sharafat Hossain	Indian National Congress
1977	**Md. Ramjan Ali**	All India Forward Bloc
1982	**Md. Ramjan Ali**	All India Forward Bloc
1987	**Md. Ramjan Ali**	All India Forward Bloc
1991	**Md. Ramjan Ali**	All India Forward Bloc
1996	**Hafiz Alam Sairani**	All India Forward Bloc
2001	**Hafiz Alam Sairani**	All India Forward Bloc
2006	**Deepa Dasmunsi**	Indian National Congress
**2009**	**Ali Imran Ramz**	All India Forward Bloc
2011	**Md. Ghulam Rabbani**	Indian National Congress
2016	**Md. Ghulam Rabbani**	All India Trinamool Congress
2021	**Md. Ghulam Rabbani**	All India Trinamool Congress
2026	**Md. Ghulam Rabbani**	All India Trinamool Congress
2026	**Md. Ghulam Rabbani**	Democratic Trinamool Congress

bolded year = bye

== Election results ==
=== 2026 ===
In the 2026 West Bengal Legislative Assembly election, Md Ghulam Rabbani of TMC defeated his nearest rival Sarajit Biswas of BJP by 83,790 votes.

2026 West Bengal Legislative Assembly election: Goalpokhar
Party	Candidate	Votes	%	±%
**AITC**	**Md Ghulam Rabbani**	**122,105**	**66.66**	**▲1.26**
BJP	Sarajit Biswas	38,315	20.92	▲1.03
IND	Md. Ghulam Sarwar	14,495	7.91	New entry
INC	Masood Md. Naseem Ahsen	2,966	1.62	▼10.38
Swaraj India	Shambhu Lal Roy	1,471	0.80	New entry
NOTA	Nota	934	0.51	▼0.74
Majority		83,790	45.74	▲0.23
Turnout		183,176	91.79	▲19.88
Rejected ballots		69	0.04	
Registered electors		199,566		▼11.16
AITC **hold**		Swing	0.23	

=== 2021 ===
West Bengal assembly elections, 2021: Goalpokhar constituency
Party	Candidate	Votes	%	±%
**AITC**	**Md. Ghulam Rabbani**	**105,649**	**65.40**	
BJP	Md. Ghulam Sarwar	32,135	19.89	
INC	Masood Md. Naseem Ahsen	19,391	12.00	
NOTA	None of the above	2,016	1.25	
Majority		73,514	45.51	
Turnout		161,535	71.91	
AITC **hold**		Swing		

=== 2016 ===
2016 West Bengal Legislative Assembly election: Goalpokhar constituency
Party	Candidate	Votes	%	±%
**AITC**	**Md. Ghulam Rabbani**	**64,869**	**43.91**	New entry
INC	Afjal Hosen	57,121	38.67	−10.38
BJP	Debashis Sarkar	16,966	11.49	+5.92
SP	Julia Yeasmin	2,887	1.95	
SUCI(C)	Dulal Rajbanshi	1,827	1.24	−0.57
BSP	Mansingha Hansda	1,805	1.22	−2.45
NOTA	None of the above	1,557	1.05	
Independent	Raghu Nath Singha	685	0.46	
Turnout		147,717	74.31	+0.85
AITC **gain** from INC		Swing		

=== 2011 ===
In the 2011 elections, Md. Ghulam Rabbani of Congress defeated his nearest rival Saifur Rahman of AIFB.

West Bengal assembly elections, 2011: Goalpokhar constituency
Party	Candidate	Votes	%	±%
**INC**	**Md. Ghulam Rabbani**	**61,313**	**49.05**	**−2.02#**
AIFB	Saifur Rahman	47,900	38.32	−4.89#
BJP	Shaukat Ali	6,956	5.57	
BSP	Kamaruzzama	4,592	3.67	
SUCI(C)	Dulal Rajbanshi	2,264	1.81	
Independent	Niva Sarkar (Das)	1,970		
Turnout		124,995	73.46	
INC **gain** from AIFB		Swing	2.87#	

.# Swing calculated on Congress and Forward Bloc vote percentages in 2006 and 2011, as adequate data not available for intervening bye-election.

=== 2009 bypoll ===
The bypoll to the Goalpokhar seat was necessitated after sitting MLA of Congress Deepa Dasmunsi resigned. For Elected As MP of Raiganj. As of Results, Ali Imran Ramz of Forward Bloc Defeated Md. Ghulam Rabbani of Congress By almost a Margin of 15,000 Votes.

West Bengal state assembly bye election, 2009: Goalpokhar constituency
Party	Candidate	Votes	%	±%
**AIFB**	**Ali Imran Ramz**	**72,017**	**76.74**	**+12.98**
INC	Md. Ghulam Rabbani	57,299	23.26	−7.47
Turnout		94710	44.88	
AIFB **gain** from INC		Swing		

=== 2009 ===
In the by election in 2009 caused by the election of the sitting MLA, Deepa Dasmunshi of Congress to the Lok Sabha from Raiganj (Lok Sabha constituency), the Goalpokhar assembly seat was won by Ali Imran Ramz of Forward Bloc. Contests in most years were multi cornered but only winners and runners are being mentioned. Deepa Dasmunshi of Congress defeated Hafiz Alam Sairani of Forward Bloc in the 2006 state assembly elections. Hafiz Alam Sairani of Forward Bloc defeated Deepa Dasmunshi of Congress in 2001, and Md Mustafa of Congress in 1996. Md Ramjan Ali of Forward Bloc defeated Nizamuddin Ahamed of Congress in 1991 and 1987, Puranmal Chand Maheswari of BJP/ Independent, in 1982 and 1977.

=== 1972 ===
Sheikh Sharafat Hussain of Congress won in 1972 and 1971. Mohamad Salimuddin of PSP won 1969 and 1967. Mohammad Hayat Ali of PSP won in 1962. Muzzafar Hussain of Congress won in 1957. Prior to that Goalpokhar constituency was not there.

== Other Statistics ==
=== 2026 ===
GP wise result

GP Name	Votes Polled			
GP Name	Votes Polled	AITC	BJP	OTH
Panjipara	19,489	11,707	5,986	1,796
Pokharia	17,764	11,532	5,198	1,034
Khagore	11,491	8,571	1,460	1,460
Jaingaon	9,419	7,169	448	1,802
Mahua	11,084	8,482	405	2,197
Dharampur-II	12,904	8,901	2,340	1,663
Dharampur-I	12,507	8,323	2,282	1,902
Goalpokhar	13,466	9,760	2,070	1,636
Lodhan	11,583	9,180	491	1,912
Goti	14,668	10,228	1,994	2,446
Sahapur-II	10,164	4,573	5,036	555
Sahapur-I	14,037	7,097	5,557	1,383
Goagaon-II	12,252	8,152	2,709	1,391
Goagaon-I	11,964	8,257	2,239	1,468
Postal Votes	330	210	100	20
Total	183,176	122,105	38,315	22,756

Round wise result

Candidate	Rounds																			Postal Votes	Total		
Candidate	1	2	3	4	5	6	7	8	9	10	11	12	13	14	15	16	17	18	19	Postal Votes	Total		
Candidate		Md Ghulam Rabbani	6,225	6,831	6,546	6,094	8,654	9,080	8,918	6,231	7,893	6,730	8,532	8,164	6,176	5,298	5,215	8,536	5,651	797	324	210	**122,105**
Sarajit Biswas	3921	2446	3314	2156	878	673	1196	2181	1871	1472	532	829	4828	3444	5171	1482	1683	25	113	100	38315		
Others	874	1072	532	798	1570	2528	1541	1507	1859	1138	1747	1916	1210	818	931	1528	1012	64	91	20	22756		
Total	11020	10349	10392	9048	11102	12281	11655	9919	11623	9340	10811	10909	12214	9560	11317	1154	8346	886	528	330	183176		

== Booth Wise Results ==
=== 2026 ===
GP Name	PS No.	Leading			Runner Up			Margin
GP Name	PS No.	Candidate	Party	Votes	Candidate	Party	Votes	Margin
Panjipara	1	Md. Ghulam Rabbani	AITC	476	Sarajit Biswas	BJP	338	138
Panjipara	2	Md. Ghulam Rabbani	AITC	408	Sarajit Biswas	BJP	157	251
Panjipara	3	Md. Ghulam Rabbani	AITC	409	Sarajit Biswas	BJP	61	348
Panjipara	4	Md. Ghulam Rabbani	AITC	622	Sarajit Biswas	BJP	157	465
Panjipara	5	Sarajit Biswas	BJP	545	Md. Ghulam Rabbani	AITC	184	361
Panjipara	6	Sarajit Biswas	BJP	818	Md. Ghulam Rabbani	AITC	175	643
Panjipara	7	Sarajit Biswas	BJP	565	Md. Ghulam Rabbani	AITC	299	266
Panjipara	8	Sarajit Biswas	BJP	651	Md. Ghulam Rabbani	AITC	61	590
Panjipara	9	Md. Ghulam Rabbani	AITC	385	Sarajit Biswas	BJP	122	263
Panjipara	10	Md. Ghulam Rabbani	AITC	420	Sarajit Biswas	BJP	213	207
Panjipara	11	Md. Ghulam Rabbani	AITC	826	Sarajit Biswas	BJP	87	739
Panjipara	12	Md. Ghulam Rabbani	AITC	541	Sarajit Biswas	BJP	81	460
Panjipara	13	Md. Ghulam Rabbani	AITC	677	Md. Ghulam Sarwar	IND	33	644
Panjipara	14	Md. Ghulam Rabbani	AITC	742	Sarajit Biswas	BJP	106	636
Panjipara	15	Md. Ghulam Rabbani	AITC	669	Md. Ghulam Sarwar	IND	166	503
Panjipara	16	Md. Ghulam Rabbani	AITC	470	Md. Ghulam Sarwar	IND	140	330
Panjipara	17	Md. Ghulam Rabbani	AITC	650	Sarajit Biswas	BJP	93	557
Panjipara	18	Md. Ghulam Rabbani	AITC	509	Sarajit Biswas	BJP	182	327
Panjipara	19	Md. Ghulam Rabbani	AITC	619	Sarajit Biswas	BJP	111	508
Panjipara	20	Md. Ghulam Rabbani	AITC	452	Sarajit Biswas	BJP	42	410
Panjipara	21	Md. Ghulam Rabbani	AITC	246	Sarajit Biswas	BJP	199	47
Panjipara	22	Sarajit Biswas	BJP	743	Md. Ghulam Rabbani	AITC	183	560
Panjipara	23	Md. Ghulam Rabbani	AITC	680	Sarajit Biswas	BJP	132	548
Panjipara	24	Md. Ghulam Rabbani	AITC	549	Md. Ghulam Sarwar	IND	35	514
Panjipara	25	Md. Ghulam Rabbani	AITC	455	Sarajit Biswas	BJP	339	116
Pokharia	26	Md. Ghulam Rabbani	AITC	455	Sarajit Biswas	BJP	339	116
Pokharia	27	Md. Ghulam Rabbani	AITC	355	Sarajit Biswas	BJP	101	254
Pokharia	28	Md. Ghulam Rabbani	AITC	576	Sarajit Biswas	BJP	267	309
Pokharia	29	Md. Ghulam Rabbani	AITC	651	Sarajit Biswas	BJP	104	547
Pokharia	30	Md. Ghulam Rabbani	AITC	833	Md. Ghulam Sarwar	IND	39	794
Pokharia	31	Md. Ghulam Rabbani	AITC	788	Md. Ghulam Sarwar	IND	29	759
Pokharia	32	Md. Ghulam Rabbani	AITC	499	Sarajit Biswas	BJP	362	137
Pokharia	33	Md. Ghulam Rabbani	AITC	758	Sarajit Biswas	BJP	21	737
Pokharia	34	Md. Ghulam Rabbani	AITC	490	Sarajit Biswas	BJP	229	261
Pokharia	35	Sarajit Biswas	BJP	338	Md. Ghulam Rabbani	AITC	189	149
Pokharia	36	Md. Ghulam Rabbani	AITC	385	Sarajit Biswas	BJP	208	177
Pokharia	37	Sarajit Biswas	BJP	255	Md. Ghulam Rabbani	AITC	230	25
Pokharia	38	Md. Ghulam Rabbani	AITC	799	Md. Ghulam Sarwar	IND	43	756
Pokharia	39	Sarajit Biswas	BJP	959	Md. Ghulam Rabbani	AITC	146	813
Pokharia	40	Sarajit Biswas	BJP	516	Md. Ghulam Rabbani	AITC	111	405
Pokharia	41	Md. Ghulam Rabbani	AITC	667	Sarajit Biswas	BJP	251	416
Pokharia	42	Md. Ghulam Rabbani	AITC	591	Sarajit Biswas	BJP	222	369
Pokharia	43	Md. Ghulam Rabbani	AITC	426	Sarajit Biswas	BJP	58	368
Pokharia	44	Sarajit Biswas	BJP	416	Md. Ghulam Rabbani	AITC	258	158
Pokharia	45	Sarajit Biswas	BJP	689	Md. Ghulam Rabbani	AITC	215	474
Pokharia	46	Md. Ghulam Rabbani	AITC	459	Sarajit Biswas	BJP	54	405
Pokharia	47	Md. Ghulam Rabbani	AITC	365	Sarajit Biswas	BJP	52	313
Pokharia	48	Md. Ghulam Rabbani	AITC	498	Md. Ghulam Sarwar	IND	31	467
Pokharia	49	Md. Ghulam Rabbani	AITC	419	Md. Ghulam Sarwar	IND	32	387
Pokharia	50	Md. Ghulam Rabbani	AITC	369	Md. Ghulam Sarwar	IND	35	334
Khagore	51	Md Ghulam Rabbani	AITC	611	Md. Ghulam Sarwar	IND	124	487
Khagore	52	Md Ghulam Rabbani	AITC	494	Md. Ghulam Sarwar	IND	50	444
Khagore	53	Md Ghulam Rabbani	AITC	838	Md. Ghulam Sarwar	IND	77	761
Khagore	54	Sarajit Biswas	BJP	571	Md Ghulam Rabbani	AITC	551	20
Khagore	55	Md Ghulam Rabbani	AITC	521	Sarajit Biswas	BJP	177	344
Khagore	56	Md Ghulam Rabbani	AITC	707	Sarajit Biswas	BJP	423	284
Khagore	57	Md Ghulam Rabbani	AITC	744	Sarajit Biswas	BJP	64	680
Khagore	58	Md Ghulam Rabbani	AITC	854	Md. Ghulam Sarwar	IND	109	745
Khagore	59	Md Ghulam Rabbani	AITC	563	Md. Ghulam Sarwar	IND	235	328
Khagore	60	Md Ghulam Rabbani	AITC	532	Md. Ghulam Sarwar	IND	54	478
Khagore	61	Md Ghulam Rabbani	AITC	550	Md. Ghulam Sarwar	IND	99	451
Khagore	62	Md Ghulam Rabbani	AITC	806	Md. Ghulam Sarwar	IND	64	742
Khagore	63	Md Ghulam Rabbani	AITC	800	Md. Ghulam Sarwar	IND	78	722
Jaingaon	64	Md Ghulam Rabbani	AITC	864	Md. Ghulam Sarwar	IND	168	696
Jaingaon	65	Md Ghulam Rabbani	AITC	711	Md. Ghulam Sarwar	IND	86	625
Jaingaon	66	Md Ghulam Rabbani	AITC	547	Md. Ghulam Sarwar	IND	53	494
Jaingaon	67	Md Ghulam Rabbani	AITC	455	Md. Ghulam Sarwar	IND	43	412
Jaingaon	68	Md Ghulam Rabbani	AITC	819	Md. Ghulam Sarwar	IND	143	676
Jaingaon	69	Md Ghulam Rabbani	AITC	583	Sarajit Biswas	BJP	306	277
Jaingaon	70	Md Ghulam Rabbani	AITC	894	Md. Ghulam Sarwar	IND	195	699
Jaingaon	71	Md Ghulam Rabbani	AITC	334	Masood Md. Naseem Ahsen	INC	208	126
Jaingaon	72	Md Ghulam Rabbani	AITC	488	Md. Ghulam Sarwar	IND	110	378
Jaingaon	73	Md Ghulam Rabbani	AITC	471	Md. Ghulam Sarwar	IND	59	412
Jaingaon	74	Md Ghulam Rabbani	AITC	1003	Md. Ghulam Sarwar	IND	115	888
Mahua	75	Md Ghulam Rabbani	AITC	583	Md. Ghulam Sarwar	IND	244	339
Mahua	76	Md Ghulam Rabbani	AITC	805	Md. Ghulam Sarwar	IND	162	643
Mahua	77	Md Ghulam Rabbani	AITC	619	Sarajit Biswas	BJP	137	482
Mahua	78	Md Ghulam Rabbani	AITC	552	Md. Ghulam Sarwar	IND	88	464
Mahua	79	Md Ghulam Rabbani	AITC	736	Md. Ghulam Sarwar	IND	104	632
Mahua	80	Md Ghulam Rabbani	AITC	545	Md. Ghulam Sarwar	IND	164	381
Mahua	81	Md Ghulam Rabbani	AITC	648	Md. Ghulam Sarwar	IND	65	583
Mahua	82	Md Ghulam Rabbani	AITC	622	Md. Ghulam Sarwar	IND	152	470
Mahua	83	Md Ghulam Rabbani	AITC	708	Md. Ghulam Sarwar	IND	97	491
Mahua	84	Md Ghulam Rabbani	AITC	526	Md. Ghulam Sarwar	IND	35	491
Mahua	85	Md Ghulam Rabbani	AITC	622	Md. Ghulam Sarwar	IND	190	432
Mahua	86	Md Ghulam Rabbani	AITC	728	Md. Ghulam Sarwar	IND	56	672
Mahua	87	Md Ghulam Rabbani	AITC	788	Md. Ghulam Sarwar	IND	102	686
Dharampur-II	88	Md Ghulam Rabbani	AITC	697	Sarajit Biswas	BJP	107	590
Dharampur-II	89	Md Ghulam Rabbani	AITC	756	Sarajit Biswas	BJP	180	576
Dharampur-II	90	Md Ghulam Rabbani	AITC	659	Sarajit Biswas	BJP	245	414
Dharampur-II	91	Md Ghulam Rabbani	AITC	739	Md. Ghulam Sarwar	IND	90	649
Dharampur-II	92	Md Ghulam Rabbani	AITC	311	Sarajit Biswas	BJP	38	273
Dharampur-II	93	Md Ghulam Rabbani	AITC	625	Sarajit Biswas	BJP	125	500
Dharampur-II	94	Md Ghulam Rabbani	AITC	393	Sarajit Biswas	BJP	357	36
Dharampur-II	95	Md Ghulam Rabbani	AITC	744	Md. Ghulam Sarwar	IND	57	687
Dharampur-II	96	Md Ghulam Rabbani	AITC	469	Sarajit Biswas	BJP	267	202
Dharampur-II	97	Sarajit Biswas	BJP	514	Md Ghulam Rabbani	AITC	410	104
Dharampur-II	98	Md Ghulam Rabbani	AITC	538	Sarajit Biswas	BJP	257	281
Dharampur-II	99	Md Ghulam Rabbani	AITC	524	Md. Ghulam Sarwar	IND	140	384
Dharampur-II	100	Md Ghulam Rabbani	AITC	455	Md. Ghulam Sarwar	IND	69	386
Dharampur-II	101	Md Ghulam Rabbani	AITC	327	Md. Ghulam Sarwar	IND	70	257
Dharampur-II	102	Md Ghulam Rabbani	AITC	476	Md. Ghulam Sarwar	IND	97	379
Dharampur-II	103	Md Ghulam Rabbani	AITC	467	Sarajit Biswas	BJP	143	324
Dharampur-II	104	Md Ghulam Rabbani	AITC	311	Md. Ghulam Sarwar	IND	111	200
Dharampur-I	105	Md Ghulam Rabbani	AITC	360	Md. Ghulam Sarwar	IND	95	265
Dharampur-I	106	Md Ghulam Rabbani	AITC	625	Md. Ghulam Sarwar	IND	78	547
Dharampur-I	107	Md Ghulam Rabbani	AITC	463	Sarajit Biswas	BJP	333	130
Dharampur-I	108	Md Ghulam Rabbani	AITC	517	Sarajit Biswas	BJP	122	395
Dharampur-I	109	Sarajit Biswas	BJP	448	Md Ghulam Rabbani	AITC	289	159
Dharampur-I	110	Md Ghulam Rabbani	AITC	392	Sarajit Biswas	BJP	190	202
Dharampur-I	111	Md Ghulam Rabbani	AITC	292	Sarajit Biswas	BJP	265	27
Dharampur-I	112	Md Ghulam Rabbani	AITC	454	Sarajit Biswas	BJP	145	309
Dharampur-I	113	Md Ghulam Rabbani	AITC	542	Sarajit Biswas	BJP	208	334
Dharampur-I	114	Md Ghulam Rabbani	AITC	806	Md. Ghulam Sarwar	IND	87	719
Dharampur-I	115	Md Ghulam Rabbani	AITC	324	Sarajit Biswas	BJP	231	93
Dharampur-I	116	Md Ghulam Rabbani	AITC	717	Md. Ghulam Sarwar	IND	264	453
Dharampur-I	117	Md Ghulam Rabbani	AITC	727	Sarajit Biswas	BJP	210	517
Dharampur-I	118	Md Ghulam Rabbani	AITC	805	Md. Ghulam Sarwar	IND	88	717
Dharampur-I	119	Md Ghulam Rabbani	AITC	476	Md. Ghulam Sarwar	IND	124	352
Dharampur-I	120	Md Ghulam Rabbani	AITC	534	Md. Ghulam Sarwar	IND	55	479
Goalpokhar	121	Md Ghulam Rabbani	AITC	558	Sarajit Biswas	BJP	203	355
Goalpokhar	122	Md Ghulam Rabbani	AITC	652	Sarajit Biswas	BJP	294	358
Goalpokhar	123	Md Ghulam Rabbani	AITC	614	Md. Ghulam Sarwar	IND	108	506
Goalpokhar	124	Md Ghulam Rabbani	AITC	764	Md. Ghulam Sarwar	IND	40	724
Goalpokhar	125	Md Ghulam Rabbani	AITC	391	Sarajit Biswas	BJP	276	115
Goalpokhar	126	Md Ghulam Rabbani	AITC	543	Md. Ghulam Sarwar	IND	41	502
Goalpokhar	127	Md Ghulam Rabbani	AITC	646	Md. Ghulam Sarwar	IND	66	580
Goalpokhar	128	Md Ghulam Rabbani	AITC	485	Sarajit Biswas	BJP	119	366
Goalpokhar	129	Md Ghulam Rabbani	AITC	559	Sarajit Biswas	BJP	141	418
Goalpokhar	130	Md Ghulam Rabbani	AITC	539	Md. Ghulam Sarwar	IND	64	475
Goalpokhar	131	Md Ghulam Rabbani	AITC	464	Md. Ghulam Sarwar	IND	50	414
Goalpokhar	132	Md Ghulam Rabbani	AITC	414	Md. Ghulam Sarwar	IND	23	391
Goalpokhar	133	Md Ghulam Rabbani	AITC	435	Sarajit Biswas	BJP	99	336
Goalpokhar	134	Md Ghulam Rabbani	AITC	291	Sarajit Biswas	BJP	62	229
Goalpokhar	135	Md Ghulam Rabbani	AITC	456	Sarajit Biswas	BJP	177	279
Goalpokhar	136	Sarajit Biswas	BJP	467	Md Ghulam Rabbani	AITC	254	213
Goalpokhar	137	Md Ghulam Rabbani	AITC	489	Md. Ghulam Sarwar	IND	56	433
Goalpokhar	138	Md Ghulam Rabbani	AITC	615	Sarajit Biswas	BJP	73	542
Goalpokhar	139	Md Ghulam Rabbani	AITC	591	Md. Ghulam Sarwar	IND	50	541
Lodhan	140	Md Ghulam Rabbani	AITC	693	Md. Ghulam Sarwar	IND	140	553
Lodhan	141	Md Ghulam Rabbani	AITC	560	Md. Ghulam Sarwar	IND	81	479
Lodhan	142	Md Ghulam Rabbani	AITC	774	Md. Ghulam Sarwar	IND	67	707
Lodhan	143	Md Ghulam Rabbani	AITC	569	Md. Ghulam Sarwar	IND	31	538
Lodhan	144	Md Ghulam Rabbani	AITC	565	Md. Ghulam Sarwar	IND	46	519
Lodhan	145	Md Ghulam Rabbani	AITC	520	Md. Ghulam Sarwar	IND	35	485
Lodhan	146	Md Ghulam Rabbani	AITC	515	Md. Ghulam Sarwar	IND	98	417
Lodhan	147	Md Ghulam Rabbani	AITC	464	Md. Ghulam Sarwar	IND	100	364
Lodhan	148	Md Ghulam Rabbani	AITC	738	Md. Ghulam Sarwar	IND	92	646
Lodhan	149	Md Ghulam Rabbani	AITC	716	Md. Ghulam Sarwar	IND	124	592
Lodhan	150	Md Ghulam Rabbani	AITC	727	Md. Ghulam Sarwar	IND	147	580
Lodhan	151	Md Ghulam Rabbani	AITC	485	Md. Ghulam Sarwar	IND	172	313
Lodhan	152	Md Ghulam Rabbani	AITC	684	Md. Ghulam Sarwar	IND	81	603
Lodhan	153	Md Ghulam Rabbani	AITC	528	Md. Ghulam Sarwar	IND	103	425
Lodhan	154	Md Ghulam Rabbani	AITC	642	Md. Ghulam Sarwar	IND	64	578
Goti	155	Md Ghulam Rabbani	AITC	680	Md. Ghulam Sarwar	IND	146	534
Goti	156	Md Ghulam Rabbani	AITC	711	Md. Ghulam Sarwar	IND	69	642
Goti	157	Md Ghulam Rabbani	AITC	611	Md. Ghulam Sarwar	IND	184	427
Goti	158	Md Ghulam Rabbani	AITC	1081	Md. Ghulam Sarwar	IND	67	1,014
Goti	159	Md Ghulam Rabbani	AITC	617	Md. Ghulam Sarwar	IND	67	550
Goti	160	Md Ghulam Rabbani	AITC	412	Sarajit Biswas	BJP	335	77
Goti	161	Md Ghulam Rabbani	AITC	337	Sarajit Biswas	BJP	142	195
Goti	162	Md Ghulam Rabbani	AITC	424	Md. Ghulam Sarwar	IND	104	320
Goti	163	Md Ghulam Rabbani	AITC	667	Md. Ghulam Sarwar	IND	157	510
Goti	164	Md Ghulam Rabbani	AITC	393	Md. Ghulam Sarwar	IND	97	296
Goti	165	Md Ghulam Rabbani	AITC	377	Md. Ghulam Sarwar	IND	77	300
Goti	166	Md Ghulam Rabbani	AITC	449	Sarajit Biswas	BJP	131	318
Goti	167	Md Ghulam Rabbani	AITC	325	Sarajit Biswas	BJP	246	79
Goti	168	Md Ghulam Rabbani	AITC	655	Md. Ghulam Sarwar	IND	118	537
Goti	169	Md Ghulam Rabbani	AITC	550	Sarajit Biswas	BJP	311	239
Goti	170	Md Ghulam Rabbani	AITC	539	Sarajit Biswas	BJP	148	391
Goti	171	Md Ghulam Rabbani	AITC	631	Sarajit Biswas	BJP	257	374
Goti	172	Md Ghulam Rabbani	AITC	769	Md. Ghulam Sarwar	IND	96	673
Sahapur-II	173	Sarajit Biswas	BJP	892	Md Ghulam Rabbani	AITC	40	852
Sahapur-II	174	Md Ghulam Rabbani	AITC	749	Sarajit Biswas	BJP	157	592
Sahapur-II	175	Sarajit Biswas	BJP	554	Md Ghulam Rabbani	AITC	466	88
Sahapur-II	176	Sarajit Biswas	BJP	824	Md Ghulam Rabbani	AITC	201	623
Sahapur-II	177	Sarajit Biswas	BJP	676	Md Ghulam Rabbani	AITC	75	601
Sahapur-II	178	Sarajit Biswas	BJP	509	Md Ghulam Rabbani	AITC	169	340
Sahapur-II	179	Md Ghulam Rabbani	AITC	558	Masood Md. Naseem Ahsen	INC	55	503
Sahapur-II	180	Md Ghulam Rabbani	AITC	290	Sarajit Biswas	BJP	205	85
Sahapur-II	181	Md Ghulam Rabbani	AITC	774	Md. Ghulam Sarwar	IND	21	753
Sahapur-II	182	Md Ghulam Rabbani	AITC	418	Sarajit Biswas	BJP	215	203
Sahapur-II	183	Md Ghulam Rabbani	AITC	502	Sarajit Biswas	BJP	85	417
Sahapur-II	184	Sarajit Biswas	BJP	415	Md Ghulam Rabbani	AITC	191	224
Sahapur-II	185	Md Ghulam Rabbani	BJP	486	Sarajit Biswas	AITC	140	346
Sahapur-I	186	Sarajit Biswas	BJP	481	Md Ghulam Rabbani	AITC	53	428
Sahapur-I	187	Sarajit Biswas	BJP	526	Md Ghulam Rabbani	AITC	129	397
Sahapur-I	188	Sarajit Biswas	BJP	487	Md Ghulam Rabbani	AITC	122	365
Sahapur-I	189	Md Ghulam Rabbani	AITC	332	Sarajit Biswas	BJP	140	192
Sahapur-I	190	Md Ghulam Rabbani	AITC	713	Sarajit Biswas	BJP	114	599
Sahapur-I	191	Md Ghulam Rabbani	AITC	546	Md. Ghulam Sarwar	IND	91	455
Sahapur-I	192	Md Ghulam Rabbani	AITC	730	Md. Ghulam Sarwar	IND	107	623
Sahapur-I	193	Md Ghulam Rabbani	AITC	358	Sarajit Biswas	BJP	186	172
Sahapur-I	194	Md Ghulam Rabbani	AITC	480	Md. Ghulam Sarwar	IND	86	394
Sahapur-I	195	Sarajit Biswas	BJP	476	Md Ghulam Rabbani	AITC	71	405
Sahapur-I	196	Sarajit Biswas	BJP	360	Md Ghulam Rabbani	AITC	158	202
Sahapur-I	197	Md Ghulam Rabbani	AITC	661	Md. Ghulam Sarwar	IND	127	534
Sahapur-I	198	Sarajit Biswas	BJP	628	Md Ghulam Rabbani	AITC	43	585
Sahapur-I	199	Md Ghulam Rabbani	BJP	603	Sarajit Biswas	AITC	342	261
Sahapur-I	200	Md Ghulam Rabbani	AITC	342	Sarajit Biswas	BJP	290	52
Sahapur-I	201	Md Ghulam Rabbani	AITC	477	Sarajit Biswas	BJP	111	366
Sahapur-I	202	Md Ghulam Rabbani	AITC	627	Md. Ghulam Sarwar	IND	65	562
Sahapur-I	203	Md Ghulam Rabbani	AITC	731	Md. Ghulam Sarwar	IND	90	641
Sahapur-I	204	Sarajit Biswas	BJP	907	Md Ghulam Rabbani	AITC	182	725
Goagaon-II	205	Sarajit Biswas	BJP	764	Md Ghulam Rabbani	AITC	197	567
Goagaon-II	206	Md Ghulam Rabbani	AITC	728	Sarajit Biswas	BJP	378	350
Goagaon-II	207	Sarajit Biswas	BJP	503	Md Ghulam Rabbani	AITC	176	327
Goagaon-II	208	Md Ghulam Rabbani	AITC	350	Md. Ghulam Sarwar	IND	42	308
Goagaon-II	209	Md Ghulam Rabbani	AITC	796	Md. Ghulam Sarwar	IND	58	738
Goagaon-II	210	Md Ghulam Rabbani	AITC	877	Md. Ghulam Sarwar	IND	71	806
Goagaon-II	211	Md Ghulam Rabbani	AITC	838	Md. Ghulam Sarwar	IND	92	746
Goagaon-II	212	Md Ghulam Rabbani	AITC	612	Md. Ghulam Sarwar	IND	69	543
Goagaon-II	213	Md Ghulam Rabbani	AITC	796	Md. Ghulam Sarwar	IND	67	729
Goagaon-II	214	Md Ghulam Rabbani	AITC	552	Sarajit Biswas	BJP	197	355
Goagaon-II	215	Md Ghulam Rabbani	AITC	760	Md. Ghulam Sarwar	IND	37	723
Goagaon-II	216	Md Ghulam Rabbani	AITC	509	Sarajit Biswas	BJP	359	150
Goagaon-II	217	Md Ghulam Rabbani	AITC	494	Md. Ghulam Sarwar	IND	103	391
Goagaon-II	218	Md Ghulam Rabbani	AITC	467	Sarajit Biswas	BJP	310	157
Goagaon-I	219	Md Ghulam Rabbani	AITC	718	Sarajit Biswas	BJP	277	441
Goagaon-I	220	Md Ghulam Rabbani	AITC	229	Sarajit Biswas	BJP	126	103
Goagaon-I	221	Md Ghulam Rabbani	AITC	538	Md. Ghulam Sarwar	IND	39	499
Goagaon-I	222	Md Ghulam Rabbani	AITC	433	Sarajit Biswas	BJP	250	183
Goagaon-I	223	Md Ghulam Rabbani	AITC	674	Md. Ghulam Sarwar	IND	120	554
Goagaon-I	224	Md Ghulam Rabbani	AITC	448	Md. Ghulam Sarwar	IND	40	408
Goagaon-I	225	Md Ghulam Rabbani	AITC	324	Sarajit Biswas	BJP	113	211
Goagaon-I	226	Md Ghulam Rabbani	AITC	292	Md. Ghulam Sarwar	IND	55	237
Goagaon-I	227	Md Ghulam Rabbani	AITC	376	Md. Ghulam Sarwar	IND	68	308
Goagaon-I	228	Md Ghulam Rabbani	AITC	336	Sarajit Biswas	BJP	306	30
Goagaon-I	229	Sarajit Biswas	BJP	501	Md Ghulam Rabbani	AITC	482	19
Goagaon-I	230	Md Ghulam Rabbani	AITC	529	Sarajit Biswas	BJP	33	496
Goagaon-I	231	Md Ghulam Rabbani	AITC	356	Md. Ghulam Sarwar	IND	21	335
Goagaon-I	232	Sarajit Biswas	BJP	402	Md Ghulam Rabbani	AITC	170	232
Goagaon-I	233	Md Ghulam Rabbani	AITC	436	Sarajit Biswas	BJP	23	413
Goagaon-I	234	Md Ghulam Rabbani	AITC	471	Md. Ghulam Sarwar	IND	31	440
Goagaon-I	235	Md Ghulam Rabbani	AITC	648	Md. Nazir Akhtar	AIMEIEM	63	585
Goagaon-I	236	Md Ghulam Rabbani	AITC	797	Md. Ghulam Sarwar	IND	30	767

== Loksabha Election Results ==
=== 2024 ===
2024 Indian General Election:Goalpokhar assembly segment
Party	Candidate	Votes	%	±%
**AITC**	**Krishna Kalyani**	**67,554**	**39.03**	**▼11.31**
INC	Ali Imran Ramz (Victor)	66,888	38.64	▲31.88
BJP	Kartick Chandra Paul	31,884	18.42	▼1.44
Others	Others	6,594	3.81	▲1.14
NOTA	Nota	181	0.1	▼1.22
Majority		666	0.39	▼30.08
Turnout		173,101	70.28	▼3.15
Registered electors		246,284		▲14.24
AITC **hold**		Swing		

Notes: Postal votes are excluded
