= Maya Ray =

Indian politician

Member of Parliament, Lok Sabha
- In office 1972–1977
- Preceded by: Siddhartha Shankar Ray
- Succeeded by: Md. Hayat Ali
- Constituency: Raiganj (West Bengal)

Personal details
- Born: 9 February 1927 Dibrugarh, Assam, British India
- Died: 11 March 2013 (aged 86) Kolkata, West Bengal, India
- Party: Indian National Congress
- Spouse: Siddhartha Shankar Ray

Maya Ray (9 February 1927 – 11 March 2013) was an Indian politician and lawyer from West Bengal. She was elected in a by-election to the Lok Sabha, the lower house of the Parliament of India from Raiganj, West Bengal, in 1972.

== Career ==
The by-election was necessitated after her husband Siddhartha Shankar Ray resigned the seat after he became the Chief Minister of West Bengal in 1972.

As a lawyer she was once referred to as "a noted barrister and former elected official" by the late Thomas J. Manton, a member of the United States House of Representatives.

== Death ==
She died of kidney failure on 11 March 2013, two and a quarter years after her husband died.
