= Hafiz Alam Sairani =

Indian politician (1960–2024)

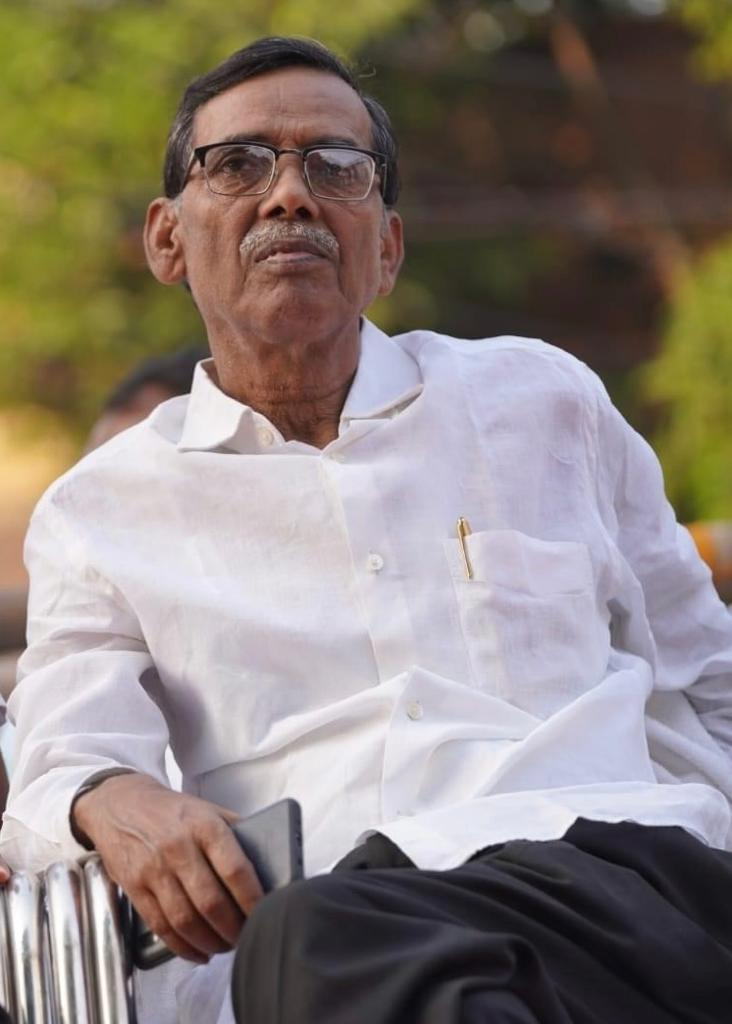
- Sairani in 2023

Vice President WBPCC Indian National Congress
- In office 21 February 2023 – 28 October 2024

Secretary All India Forward Bloc
- In office 2008–2022

Member of the West Bengal Legislative Assembly
- In office 1994–2006
- Preceded by: Md. Ramjan Ali
- Succeeded by: Deepa Dasmunsi
- Constituency: Goalpokhar

Minister of Relief and Cooperative
- In office 1996–2001
- In office 2001–2006

Personal details
- Born: 1 February 1960 Binardah, Uttar Dinajpur, India
- Died: 28 October 2024 (aged 64) Kolkata, India
- Party: Indian National Congress (from 2022) All India Forward Bloc (1980–2022)
- Spouse: Hena Hafiz
- Education: University of Calcutta

Hafiz Alam Sairani (1 February 1960 – 28 October 2024) was an Indian politician who was Vice President of West Bengal State Congress Committee (WBPCC). Sairani joined Indian National Congress on 3 November 2022 after resigning from all posts of All India Forward Bloc. He was Secretary of All India Forward Bloc and former Secretariat Member of Left Front State Committee. Hafiz resigned from All India Forward Bloc on 23 September 2022. He was also Relief and Co-operative Minister of the Left Front government in West Bengal.

A commerce and education graduate, he was a teacher by profession. Sairani was a state secretariat member and central committee member of the Forward Bloc. And also the member of state Left Front.

Sairani was elected MLA from Goalpokhar in 1996 and 2001.

== Early life ==
Sairani was born at Binardah, a small village of Uttar Dinajpur on 1 February 1960. He belonged to a Bengali Muslim family which had produced another famous son, politician and former MLA Ramzan Ali, his elder brother. His father was also well known in that region and worked as a landlord. A student of Chakulia High School, Chakulia, Uttar Dinajpur, Sairani studied Commerce from Calcutta University, Kolkata, and secured his M.A degree, and started working in Chakulia High School as a teacher.

== Career ==
In 1994, Sairani was elected as a Legislative Assembly Member for the first time. His constituency was Goalpokhar. He was given charge of the Uttar Dinajpur district by the party. He was also given charge of the Relief department of West Bengal Government. Due to his good image he was also given the charge of Cooperative department.

== Death ==
Sairani died at the IPGMER and SSKM Hospital in Kolkata, on 28 October 2024, at the age of 64. He had been diagnosed with lung cancer.
