= Minhajul Arfin Azad =

Indian politician

Member of the West Bengal Legislative Assembly
- Incumbent
- Assumed office 2 May 2021
- Preceded by: Ali Imran Ramz
- Constituency: Chakulia

Block President Goalpokher II Trinamool Congress

Member Uttar Dinajpur Zilla Parishad
- In office August 2013 – August 2018

Personal details
- Born: circa 1971 (age 54–55) India
- Party: TMC (until 2026); Mamata All India Trinamool Congress (from 2026)
- Spouse: Julesha Khatoon
- Education: Bhupendra Narayan Mandal University
- Profession: Politician

Minhajul Arfin Azad (Bengali: মিনহাজুল আরফিন আজাদ) is an Indian Trinamool Congress politician and farmer. He has been serving as a member of the West Bengal Legislative Assembly for Chakulia since May 2021.

== Early life and family ==
Minhajul Arfin Azad was born to a Bengali Muslim family from Village Kariat, Chakulia, Uttar Dinajpur district. His father's name is Atiur Rahman Azad. In 2001, Azad graduated from the Bhupendra Narayan Mandal University in Laloonagar, Madhepura, Bihar with a Bachelor of Arts in Geography.

== Career ==
He contested the 2021 West Bengal Legislative Assembly election from Chakulia Vidhan Sabha and won the seat on 2 May 2021 by polling 49.78% of the vote, compared to 30.26% for his nearest rival Sachin Prasad of the BJP.
