= Abdul Karim Chowdhury =

Indian politician

Minister for Mass Education Extension and Library Services, Government of West Bengal
- In office May 20, 2011 – May 10, 2016
- Governor: M. K. Narayanan; D. Y. Patil (additional charge); Keshari Nath Tripathi
- Constituency: Islampur

Member of the West Bengal Legislative Assembly
- In office 2 May 2021 – 7 May 2026; 1967-1982, 1991-2001, 2011-2016
- Constituency: Islampur
- Preceded by: Kanaia Lal Agarwal
- Succeeded by: Kanaia Lal Agarwal

Personal details
- Born: 23 November 1946 (age 79) Islampur, Bengal Presidency, British India
- Party: Trinamool Congress (2008–present); Indian National Congress (1967–2008)
- Children: 2
- Education: Siliguri College

Abdul Karim Chowdhury is an Indian politician and the former MLA of Islampur. He had been elected as an MLA for 12 terms, making him one of the veteran leaders of West Bengal.

He has been a former Minister for Mass Education Extension and Library Services in the Government of West Bengal. He is also one of the vice presidents of the Trinamool Congress (West Bengal unit).

Chowdhury is a graduate of Siliguri College, affiliated to the North Bengal University.

He has been closely involved in the political landscape of West Bengal, where he has witnessed significant shifts in the political arena. One of the key events during his journey was the departure of Chowdhury from the Trinamool Congress (TMC) in 2017. This was a notable moment in the region’s political scene, marked by internal tensions within the TMC.

According to an article in The Telegraph, Chowdhury left the TMC after feeling insulted by the party leadership. His departure was a significant development, highlighting the often complex and turbulent nature of political affiliations in the state. This event underscored the struggles of party loyalty and the challenges that come with leadership dynamics within major political parties.

This incident, although from 2017, continues to have implications for the political landscape in West Bengal, influencing the relationships between key political figures and their parties.
