= Golam Yazdani =

Indian politician

Dr. Golam Yazdani

Member of Legislative Assembly
- In office 1957–1971, 1977–1980
- Constituency: Kharba

Member of Parliament
- In office 1980–1991
- Constituency: Raiganj

Personal details
- Born: January 1917 Habinagar, Malda district
- Died: 14 May 2009 (aged 92 years) Chanchal, Malda district
- Party: Indian National Congress
- Spouse: Maleka Begum
- Children: 2 sons 1)Alberuni Zulkarnain Golam Mohd 2)Albattani Zulkarnain Golam Mohd

Dr. Golam Yazdani (1917–2009) was a controversial Indian politician from West Bengal. He was a six-time MLA, a three-time MP and a cabinet minister in the Indian National Congress government of West Bengal. He was in jail for political reasons between 1971 and 1974, for around three years. He went underground for about twenty months during the emergency.

== Early years ==
Golam Yazdani, son of Moulvi Raisuddin Ahmed, was born at Barogachi in Malda district in January 1917. He qualified as a doctor, passing M.B.B.S., DTM & H, and D.G.O. from Calcutta Medical College, Calcutta School of Tropical Medicine and Chittaranjan Seva Sadan, all at Kolkata. He married Maleka Begum in 1980 and had two sons.

== Political career ==
He won the Kharba seat as an independent candidate in 1957, 1962, 1967 and 1969, and as a CPI(M) candidate in 1971. He did not contest as a candidate in 1972 and won it back as an independent candidate in 1977.

At that time Kharba assembly segment was part of Raiganj. Dr. Golam Yazdani successfully contested the Raiganj parliamentary seat as a Congress candidate in 1980, 1984 and 1989.

He was a cabinet minister for civil defence and passport in West Bengal from 1969 to 1970.

He was in emergency medical service during World War II, from 1943 to 1947. He was imprisoned for anti indian activities from 1971 to 1974, and went underground during the emergency for 20 months.

He contributed substantially for the establishment of Chanchal College in 1969.

Dr. Golam Yazdani's popularity was because of his being a doctor and his social work.

== Death ==
Dr. Golam Yazdani died at his Chanchal residence on 14 May 2009. He was 93. He was survived by two sons. His elder son Alberuni was active in politics in the Congress party. Alberuni later contested in 2011 Assembly elections as an independent candidate.
