= Kharba Assembly constituency =

Coordinates: 25.42°N 88.08°E

Kharba
- Former constituency No. 41 for the West Bengal Legislative Assembly

Constituency details
- Country: India
- Region: East India
- State: West Bengal
- District: Malda
- Lok Sabha constituency: Raiganj
- Established: 1951
- Abolished: 2011
- Reservation: None

Kharba Assembly constituency was an assembly constituency in Malda district in the Indian state of West Bengal.

== Overview ==
As a consequence of the orders of the Delimitation Commission, Kharba Assembly constituency and Araidanga Assembly constituency cease to exist from 2011. There are two new constituencies in the area – Chanchal Assembly constituency and Malatipur Assembly constituency.

Kharba Assembly constituency was part of Raiganj (Lok Sabha constituency)

== Members of the Legislative Assembly ==
Year	Member	Party
1952	Tafazzal Hossain	Indian National Congress
1957	Golam Yazdani	Independent politician
1962	Golam Yazdani	Independent politician
1967	Golam Yazdani	Independent politician
1969	Golam Yazdani	Independent politician
1971	Golam Yazdani	Communist Party of India (Marxist)
1972	Mahabubul Haque	Indian National Congress
1977	Golam Yazdani	Independent politician
1982	Mahabubul Haque	Indian National Congress
1987	Nazmul Hoque	Communist Party of India (Marxist)
1991	Nazmul Hoque	Communist Party of India (Marxist)
1996	Mahabubul Haque	Indian National Congress
2001	Mahabubul Haque	Indian National Congress
2006	Mahabubul Haque	Indian National Congress
2008^	Asif Mahboob	Indian National Congress

- ^ indicates by-election
- For MLAs from the area in subsequent years see Chanchal Assembly constituency and Malatipur Assembly constituency

== Election results ==
Vote share of Winning candidates
2008 (By-Poll)	49.57%
2006	50.63%
2001	49.38%
1996	47.13%
1991	43.97%
1987	47.32%
1982	49.33%
1977	44.61%
1972	47.75%
1971	53.65%
1969	54.32%
1967	56.58%
1962	56.87%
1957	54.05%
1951	64.83%

=== 2008 by-election ===
CAUSE OF VACANCY: Due to death of Shri Mahabubul Haque (Badal)

2008 West Bengal Legislative Assembly by-election: Kharba
Party	Candidate	Votes	%	±%
INC	Asif Mehbub	67,067	49.57	
CPI(M)	Anjumanara	56,674	41.89	
BJP	Sital Chakraborty	6,985	5.16	
AITC	Abdul Khaleque	4,547	3.36	
Majority		10,393	7.68	
Turnout				
INC hold		Swing		

=== 2006 ===
2006 West Bengal Legislative Assembly election: Kharba
Party	Candidate	Votes	%	±%
INC	Mahabubul Haque (Badal)	66,877	50.63	
CPI(M)	Anjumanara	56,690	42.92	
AITC	Abdul Khaleque	5,405	4.09	
BSP	Sahabuddin	3,120	2.36	
Majority		10,187	7.71	
Turnout				
INC hold		Swing		

=== 2001 ===
2001 West Bengal Legislative Assembly election: Kharba
Party	Candidate	Votes	%	±%
INC	Mahabubul Haque (Badal)	56,819	49.38	
CPI(M)	Nazmul Hoque	48,395	42.06	
BJP	Dr. Kalyan Pandey	7,003	6.09	
PDS	Mafijuddin Ahmed	2,843	2.47	
Majority		8,424	7.32	
Turnout		115,083	75.59	
INC hold		Swing		

=== 1996 ===
1996 West Bengal Legislative Assembly election: Kharba
Party	Candidate	Votes	%	±%
INC	Mahbubul Hoque	59,807	47.13	
CPI(M)	Nazmul Hoque	53,077	41.83	
BJP	Subhash Krishna Goswami	10,812	8.52	
CPI(ML)L	Najrul	2,031	1.60	
Independent	Safiqul Islam	655	0.52	
Independent	Baidya Nath Das	287	0.23	
Independent	Kasiruddin Ahmed	230	0.18	
Majority		6,730	5.30	
Turnout		128,360	88.16	
Swing to INC from CPI(M)		Swing		

=== 1991 ===
1991 West Bengal Legislative Assembly election: Kharba
Party	Candidate	Votes	%	±%
CPI(M)	Nazmul Haque	48,928	43.97	
INC	Mahabubul Haque	46,824	42.08	
BJP	Ashesh Krishan Goswami	12,369	11.12	
IUML	Abdul Sattar	1,245	1.12	
Independent	Dharm Chand Jain	789	0.71	
BSP	Nakul Rabidas	705	0.63	
WPI	Ali Liakat	408	0.37	
Majority		2,104	1.89	
Turnout		112,971	83.46	
CPI(M) hold		Swing		

=== 1987 ===
1987 West Bengal Legislative Assembly election: Kharba
Party	Candidate	Votes	%	±%
CPI(M)	Nazmul Hoque	44,040	47.32	
INC	Mahbubul Haque	37,803	40.62	
BJP	Sital Chakraborty	6,647	7.14	
IUML	Abdus Sattar	4,571	4.91	
Majority		6,237	6.70	
Turnout		94,325	83.31	
Swing to CPI(M) from INC		Swing		

=== 1982 ===
1982 West Bengal Legislative Assembly election: Kharba
Party	Candidate	Votes	%	±%
INC	Mahbubul Hoque	40,165	49.33	
CPI(M)	Nazmul Hoque	37,455	46.00	
BJP	Sital Chakraborty	3,805	4.67	
Majority		2,710	3.33	
Turnout		82,764	85.95	
Swing to INC from Independent		Swing		

=== 1977 ===
1977 West Bengal Legislative Assembly election: Kharba
Party	Candidate	Votes	%	±%
Independent	Golam Yazdani	24,564	44.61	
INC	Mahabubul Haque	14,779	26.84	
JP	Nizamuddin Choudhury	7,556	13.72	
CPI(M)	Najimul Haque	6,015	10.92	
Independent	Dharma Deb Mondal	2,075	3.77	
Independent	Alijan Mia	69	0.13	
Majority		9,785	17.77	
Turnout		55,848	68.24	
Swing to Independent from INC		Swing		

=== 1972 ===
1972 West Bengal Legislative Assembly election: Kharba
Party	Candidate	Votes	%	±%
INC	Mahabubul Haque	25,512	47.75	
CPI(M)	Mazimul Haque	24,843	46.50	
INC(O)	Birendra Kumar Maitra	3,074	5.75	
Majority		669	1.25	
Turnout		54,484	75.61	
Swing to INC from CPI(M)		Swing		

=== 1971 ===
1971 West Bengal Legislative Assembly election: Kharba
Party	Candidate	Votes	%	±%
CPI(M)	Golam Yazadani	29,283	53.65	
INC	Mahabubul Haque	22,862	41.89	
Independent	Saiyed Ali	1,049	1.92	
INC(O)	Sudhir Kumar Das	788	1.44	
Bangla Congress	Sarkar Borodakanta	595	1.09	
Majority		6,421	11.76	
Turnout		55,821	78.16	
Swing to CPI(M) from Independent		Swing		

=== 1969 ===
1969 West Bengal Legislative Assembly election: Kharba
Party	Candidate	Votes	%	±%
Independent	Golam Yazdani	28,025	54.32	
INC	Mahabubul Haque	21,232	41.15	
ABJS	Pinakijoy Bhattacharya	2,334	4.52	
Majority		6,793	13.17	
Turnout		53,041	78.48	
Independent hold		Swing		

=== 1967 ===
1967 West Bengal Legislative Assembly election: Kharba
Party	Candidate	Votes	%	±%
Independent	G. Yazdani	27,627	56.58	
INC	M. Haque	21,201	43.42	
Majority		6,426	13.16	
Turnout		50,395	77.52	
Independent hold		Swing		

=== 1962 ===
1962 West Bengal Legislative Assembly election: Kharba
Party	Candidate	Votes	%	±%
Independent	Golam Yazdani	23,664	56.87	
INC	Tafazzal Hossain	15,533	37.33	
Independent	Santosh Kumar Goswami	2,416	5.81	
Majority		8,131	19.54	
Turnout		44,269	64.93	
Independent hold		Swing		

=== 1957 ===
1957 West Bengal Legislative Assembly election: Kharba
Party	Candidate	Votes	%	±%
Independent	Golam Yazdani	16,382	54.05	
INC	Tafazzal Hossain	12,152	40.09	
Independent	Aswini Kuma Deb	1,775	5.86	
Majority		4,230	13.96	
Turnout		30,309	51.33	
Swing to Independent from INC		Swing		

=== 1951 ===
1951 West Bengal Legislative Assembly election: Kharba
Party	Candidate	Votes	%	±%
INC	Tafazzal Hossain	14,033	64.83	
CPI	Birendra Krishna Goswami	5,639	26.05	
KMPP	Raisuddin Chowdhury	1,975	9.12	
Majority		8,394	38.78	
Turnout		21,647	43.05	
INC win (new seat)				
