= Md. Ghulam Rabbani =

Indian politician

Cabinet Minister Government of West Bengal
- In office 10 May 2021 – 4 May 2026
- Governor: Jagdeep Dhankhar; La. Ganesan (additional charge); C. V. Ananda Bose
- Chief Minister: Mamata Banerjee
- Ministry and Departments: Non Conventional and Renewable Energy Sources

Member of the West Bengal Legislative Assembly
- Incumbent
- Assumed office 2011
- Preceded by: Ali Imran Ramz
- Constituency: Goalpokhar

Minister of State for Department of Labour Government of West Bengal
- In office 2016–2021
- Governor: Keshari Nath Tripathi; Jagdeep Dhankhar
- Chief Minister: Mamata Banerjee

Personal details
- Born: 1970 (age 55–56) Goalpokhar, Uttar Dinajpur
- Party: Democratic Trinamool Congress
- Other political affiliations: Indian National Congress (2009-2016). All India Trinamool Congress (2016-2026).
- Education: Aligarh Muslim University (M.A)

Md. Ghulam Rabbani is an Indian politician and cabinet minister of environment and Non-Conventional and Renewable Energy Sources in the West Bengal government. He served as Cabinet Minister of State for Minority Affairs & Madrassah Education in Government of West Bengal from 2021 to 2023. Rabbani belongs to All India Trinamool Congress. He was elected as MLA of Goalpokhar Vidhan Sabha Constituency in 2011, 2016 and 2021.
