= Kanaia Lal Agarwal =

Indian politician

Member of West Bengal Legislative Assembly
- Incumbent
- Assumed office 4 May 2026
- Preceded by: Abdul Karim Chowdhury
- Constituency: Islampur

Kanaia Lal Agarwal (born 19 September 1954) is an Indian politician from West Bengal. He is a former member of the West Bengal Legislative Assembly from Islampur Assembly constituency in Uttar Dinajpur district. He was elected in the 2016 West Bengal Legislative Assembly election representing the Indian National Congress.

== Early life and education ==
Agarwal is from Islampur, Uttar Dinajpur district, West Bengal. He is the son of late Golab Chand Agarwal. He completed his MCom at University of North Bengal in 1975 and later did LLB, also at University of North Bengal, in 1975.

== Career ==
Agarwal was first elected as an MLA from Islampur Assembly constituency representing the Indian National Congress in the 2016 West Bengal Legislative Assembly election. He polled 65,559 votes and defeated his nearest rival, Abdul Karim Chowdhury of the All India Trinamool Congress, by a margin of 7,718 votes. He secured a vote share of 43.88 per cent.

Earlier in May 2015, he was elected as the chairman of the Islampur municipality. It was alleged that he took all the councillors of his party to a secret location and kept them there for three weeks before the election to prevent Trinamool minister Abdul Karim Chowdhury who allegedly tried to poach the Congress members.
