= Priya Ranjan Dasmunsi =

Indian politician (1945–2017)

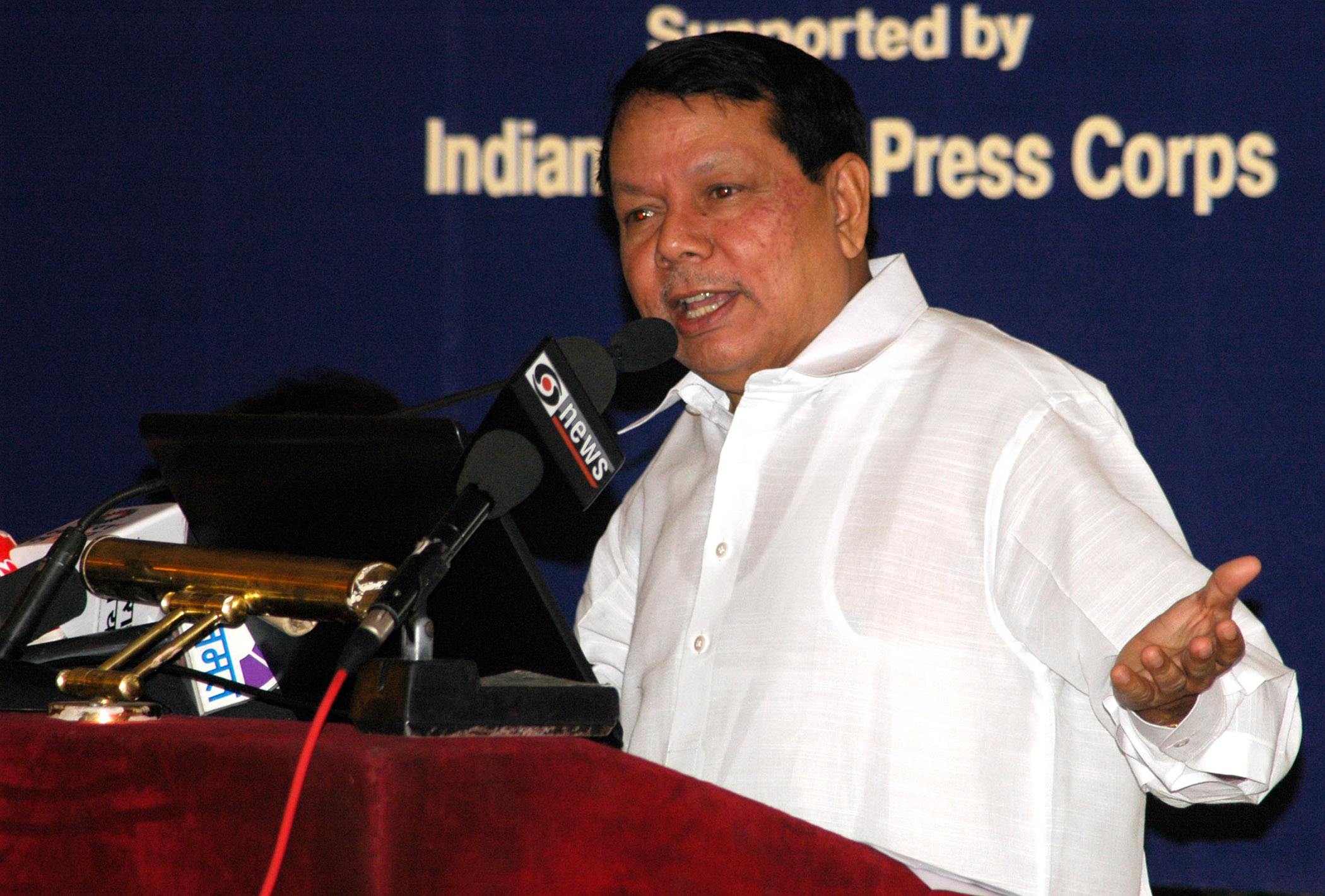
- Dasmunsi in 2007

Member of Parliament, Lok Sabha
- In office 6 October 1999 – 16 May 2009
- Preceded by: Subrata Mukherjee
- Succeeded by: Deepa Dasmunsi
- Constituency: Raiganj
- In office 9 May 1996 – 4 December 1997
- Preceded by: Susanta Chakraborty
- Succeeded by: Bikram Sarkar
- Constituency: Howrah
- In office 31 December 1984 – 2 December 1989
- Preceded by: Samar Mukherjee
- Succeeded by: Susanta Chakraborty
- Constituency: Howrah
- In office 25 March 1971 – 24 March 1977
- Preceded by: Ganesh Ghosh
- Succeeded by: Dilip Chakravarty
- Constituency: Calcutta South

Minister of Parliamentary Affairs
- In office 28 May 2004 – 12 October 2008
- Prime Minister: Manmohan Singh
- Preceded by: Ghulam Nabi Azad
- Succeeded by: Vayalar Ravi

Minister of Information and Broadcasting
- In office 18 November 2005 – 11 November 2008
- Prime Minister: Manmohan Singh
- Preceded by: S. Jaipal Reddy
- Succeeded by: Ambika Soni

9th President of All India Football Federation
- In office 1988–2008
- Preceded by: Khalifa Ziauddin
- Succeeded by: Praful Patel

Personal details
- Born: 13 November 1945 Chirirbander, Bengal Province, British India (now in Dinajpur, Bangladesh)
- Died: 20 November 2017 (aged 72) New Delhi, India
- Party: Indian National Congress (1967–1978) (1984–2017)
- Other political affiliations: Indian National Congress (U)/Indian Congress (Socialist) (1978–1984)
- Spouse: Deepa Dasmunsi (m. 1994)
- Children: 1 (son)

Priya Ranjan Dasmunsi (Prio Rônjon Dashmunshi; 13 November 1945 – 20 November 2017) was an Indian National Congress politician, former Union Minister and a member of the 14th Lok Sabha of India. He represented the Raiganj constituency of West Bengal.

== Career ==
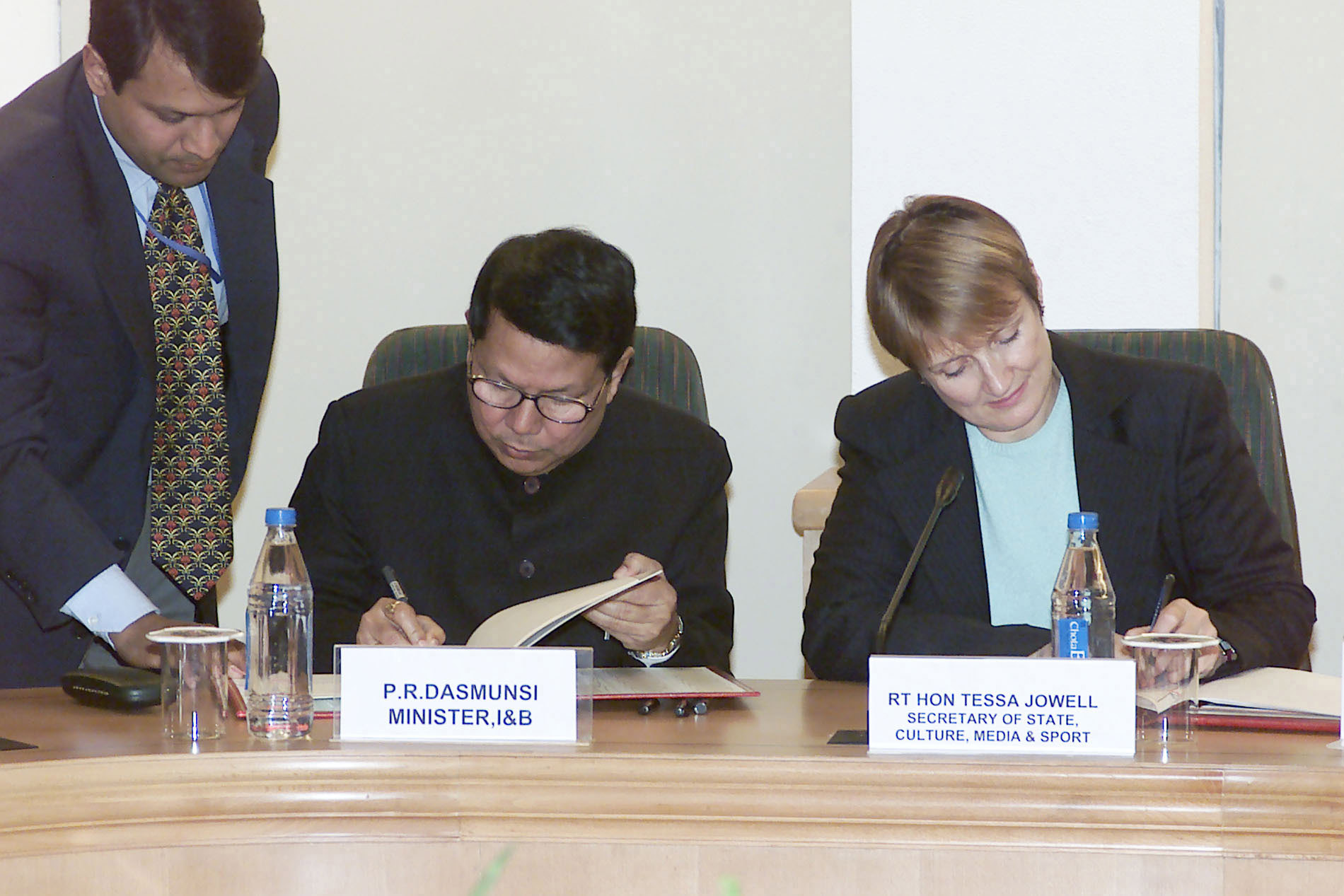
Dasmunsi signing an Agreement on "Indo-UK Film Co-operation" in New Delhi, December 5, 2005.

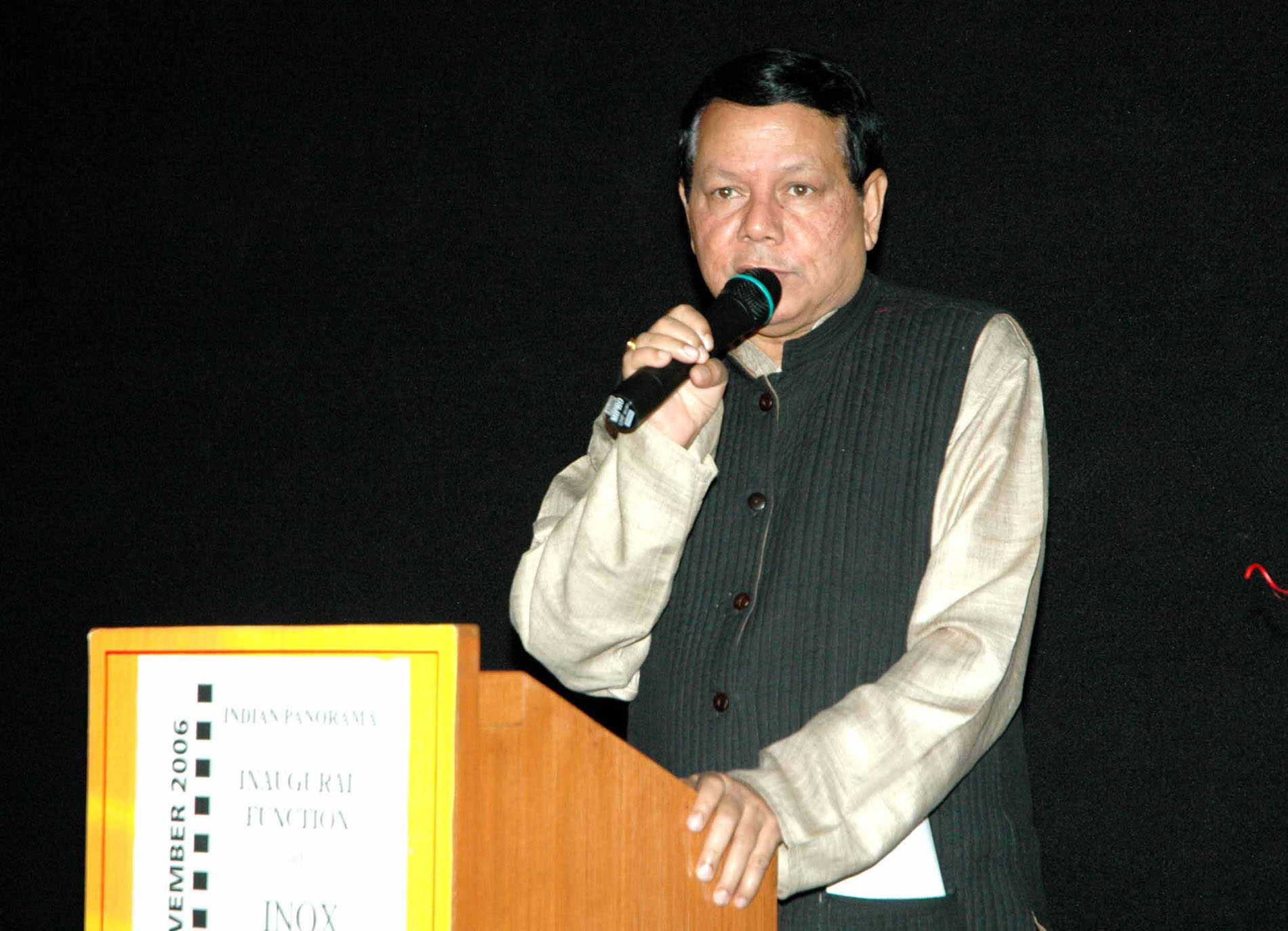
Dasmunsi addressing at the inauguration of the Indian Panorama during the 37th International Film Festival (IFFI) in Panaji, Goa, November 24, 2006.

Dasmunshi entered politics as a member of the Chhatra Parishad, the student's wing of the state Congress unit while studying in the Calcutta University as a protégé of veteran Congress leader Atulya Ghosh when the state was hit with the first-wave of Naxalite-Maoist insurgency, which saw large number of students from well-reputed colleges & universities of Calcutta abandon their studies to take up arms against the state in lines of the people's war strategy of Naxalite ideologue Charu Majumdar. He, alongside Subrata Mukherjee & Somen Mitra was the prominent militant face of the Chhatra Parishad who clashed heads-on with the student cadres of both CPI(M) & CPI(ML) alike in the politically turbulent atmosphere of the state caused by a fractured mandate in the state elections & the Naxalite insurgents. Known for his organisational capability, fiery speeches & strong anti-Communist stance, Dasmunshi was violently assaulted by CPI(M) cadres in 1967 after a street rally in the suburbs of North Calcutta, which left him with a fractured arm, thereby cementing his image as a firebrand anti-Communist leader. Dasmunsi was made state president of Indian Youth Congress from 1970 to 1971. He was elected from the South Calcutta constituency in the 1971 Indian general election at the age of 26, defeating veteran Communist leader & freedom fighter Ganesh Ghosh. He lost the seat to Janata Party candidate Dilip Chakravarty in the next general election. After having a fallout with Sanjay Gandhi, Dasmunshi joined the Congress(Urs) of D. Devraj Urs in 1978. Following him coming 4th in the South Calcutta constituency during the 1980 Indian general election & the dismal performance of the party in 1982 state election, he returned back to the Congress(I) in 1984 after Indira Gandhi's murder. He was appointed as the Union Minister of State for Commerce in 1985 by prime minister Rajiv Gandhi after being elected from the Howrah constituency promising re-industrialisation of the area. But his failure to keep his electoral promise saw him lose the seat in the 1989 general election. He also led a fiery campaign against the CPI(M)-led Left Front government of the state in 1987 state election as the state PCC chief, but failed to dislodge the Communists. He again lost from Howrah in 1991, but was re-elected back from there in 1996. From 1999, he was the MP from Raiganj constituency

In 2004, in the First Manmohan Singh ministry, he was appointed as the Minister of Parliamentary Affairs and the Ministry of Information and Broadcasting. He controversially banned television networks he deemed "obscene", including a three-month ban on the Sony-owned television network AXN and Fashion TV.

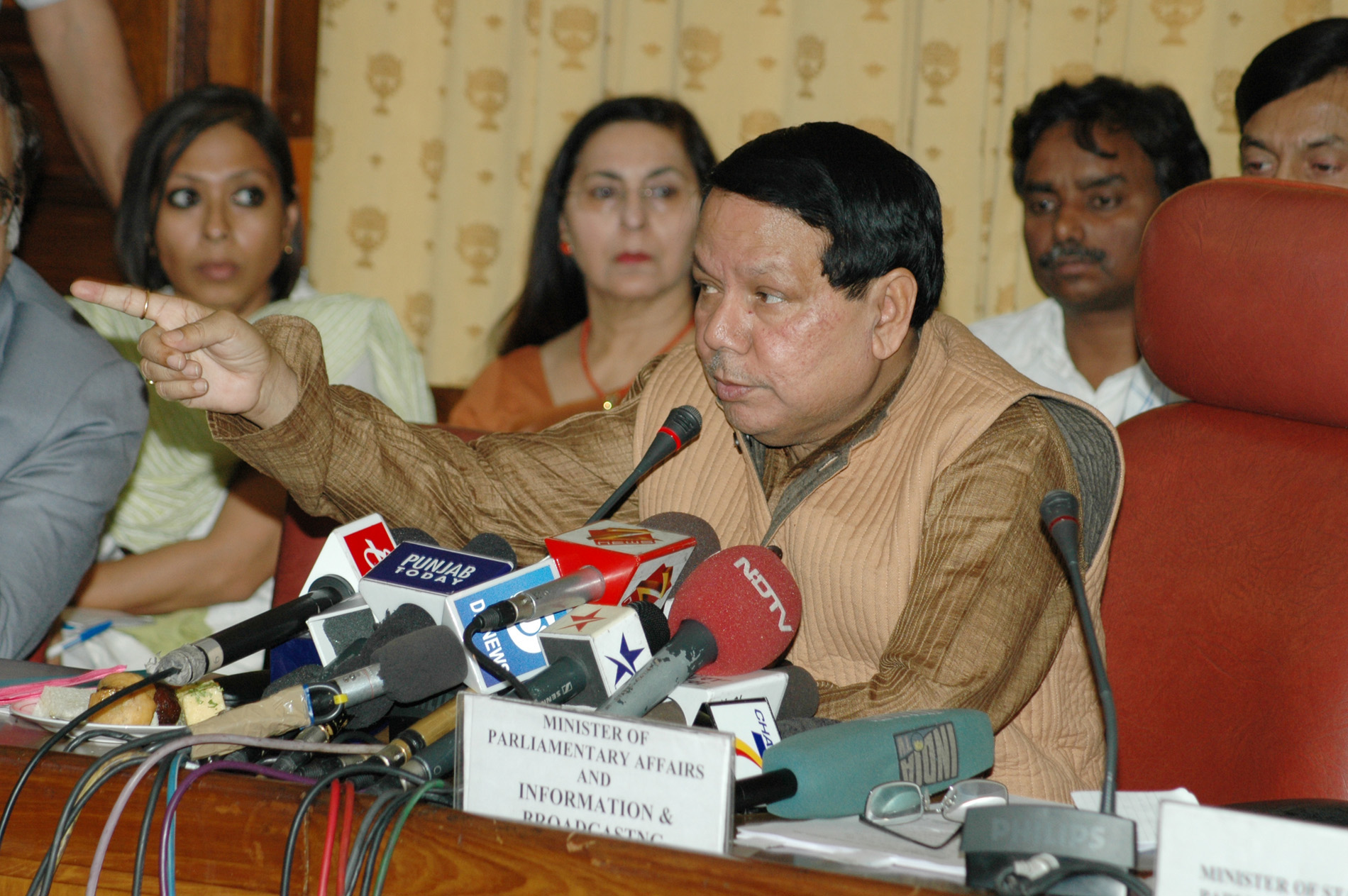
Dasmunsi (as Union Minister for Information & Broadcasting and Parliamentary Affairs) addressing a press conference, in New Delhi, March 22, 2006.

In 2007, Dasmunsi was also responsible requiring broadcaster Nimbus Communications to share broadcast rights for the Indian cricket team with the state television network, Doordarshan — this despite Nimbus paying hundreds of millions of dollars for the rights to the Board of Control for Cricket in India.

Dasmunsi served as the president of the All India Football Federation for almost twenty years, from 1988 to 2008. He was succeeded by Nationalist Congress Party politician Praful Patel.

Dasmushi was re-elected as the state PCC chief in 2008 & remained so until 2010, when he was replaced with Manas Bhunia.

=== Electoral record ===
- In 1971, Dasmunsi won in the general elections from the Constituency (Lok Sabha) South Calcutta.
- In 1984, he won in the general elections from the Howrah (Lok Sabha constituency).
- In 1989, he lost in the general elections from Howrah.
- In 1991, he lost in the general elections from Howrah.
- In 1996, he won in the general elections from Howrah.
- In 1999, he won in the general elections from Raiganj (Lok Sabha constituency)
- In 2004, he won in the general elections from Raiganj (Lok Sabha constituency).

=== All India Football Federation ===
Dasmunsi succeeded Khalifa Ziauddin as the president of the All India Football Federation (AIFF) in December 1988. Under his leadership, the AIFF launched the National Football League in 1996. The National Football League would be replaced by the I-League for the 2007-08 season. The India national football team won the 2008 AFC Challenge Cup in Delhi to qualify for the 2011 AFC Asian Cup in Doha.

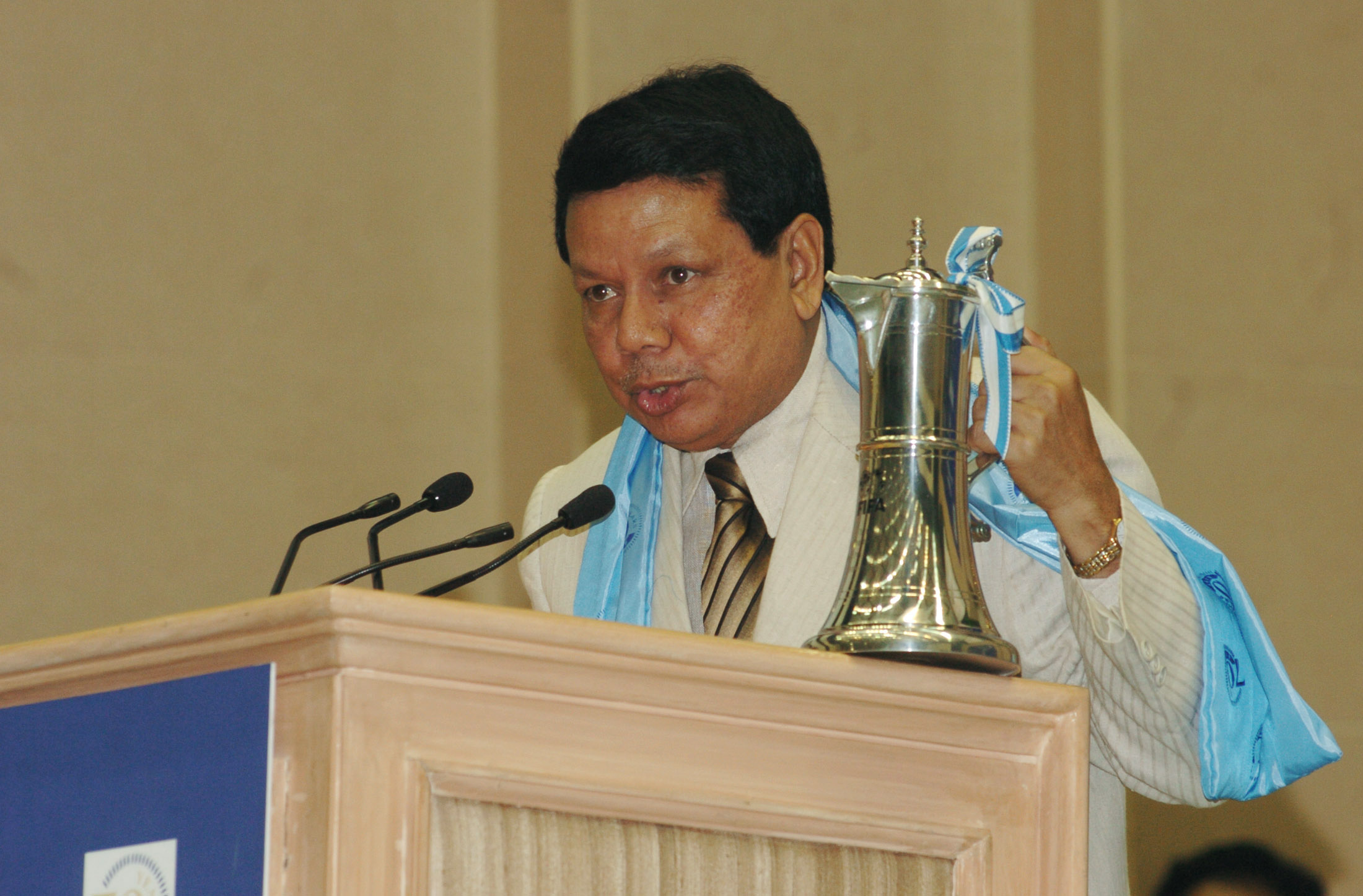
Dasmunsi speaking, after receiving the FIFA plaque from FIFA, April 2007.

He was a member of the FIFA Technical Study Group Member in 1995 FIFA Women's World Cup held in Sweden and a Match Commissioner in 1999 FIFA Women's World Cup held in the United States. He was also the first Indian official to be appointed as a special Duty officer, at the 1998 FIFA World Cup and the 2002 FIFA World Cup. He was also the Chef`de Mission of the India Olympics Contingent at the 2004 Summer Olympics, and Match Commissioner for two World Cup Matches at the 2006 FIFA World Cup in Germany.

== Personal life and death ==
Dasmunsi was married in 1994 to Mrs. Deepa Dasmunsi, a social worker from Kolkata. They have a young son, Priyadeep Dasmunshi.

Dasmunsi suffered from numerous problems like diabetes and hypertension during his prime. While attending Durga Puja celebrations at his ancestral residence at Kaliaganj, he suffered a massive stroke and paralysis on 12 October 2008, leaving him in minimum conscious state. He was admitted to the All India Institute of Medical Sciences (AIIMS) in New Delhi and was later shifted to Apollo Hospital in New Delhi. He remained on life support, and was diagnosed with a complete failure of the left ventricular system. In November 2009, Dasmunsi was temporarily moved to Düsseldorf, where he underwent stem cell therapy in an attempt to reverse some of the loss of brain functions caused by the stroke.

Since Dasmunsi's hospitalization, his wife Deepa, to some extent had taken over his political mantle; she was elected from Raiganj (Lok Sabha constituency) in 2009.

On 10 October 2011, the Indraprastha Apollo Hospital in Delhi advised his family to take him home and care for him there.

After lingering for nine years in coma, Dasmunsi finally died on 20 November 2017, a week after his 72nd birthday. His dead body was taken to Kaliaganj and was cremated at the local crematorium.

Lok Sabha
| Preceded by Ganesh Ghosh | Member of Parliament for Kolkata Dakshin; 1971 – 1977 | Succeeded by Dilip Chakravarty |
| Preceded by Samar Mukherjee | Member of Parliament for Howrah; 1984 – 1989 | Succeeded by Susanta Chakraborty |
| Preceded by Susanta Chakraborty | Member of Parliament for Howrah; 1996– 1998 | Succeeded by Bikram Sarkar |
| Preceded by Subrata Mukherjee | Member of Parliament for Raiganj; 1999 – 2009 | Succeeded by Deepa Dasmunsi |
Political offices
| Preceded by Dayanidhi Maran | Minister of Information and Broadcasting; 2007 – 2009 | Succeeded by Ambika Soni |
