= Deepa Dasmunsi =

Indian politician (born 1960)

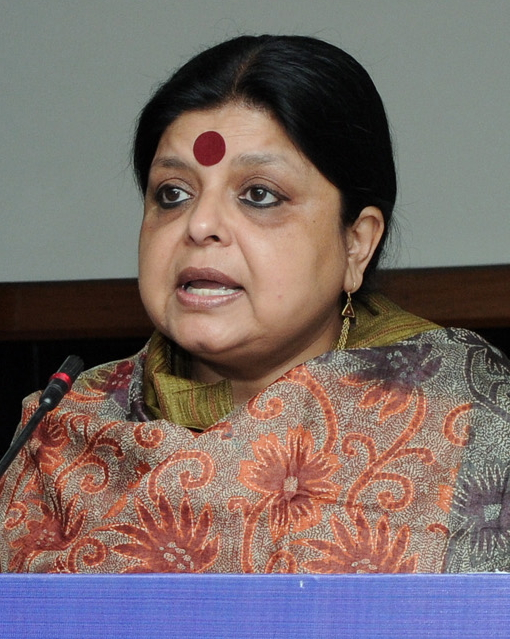

Union Minister of State for Urban Development
- In office 28 October 2012 – 26 May 2014
- Prime Minister: Dr. Manmohan Singh
- Preceded by: Saugata Roy

Member of Parliament, 15th Lok Sabha
- In office 16 May 2009 — 16 May 2014
- Preceded by: Priya Ranjan Dasmunsi
- Succeeded by: Mohammed Salim
- Constituency: Raiganj

Member, West Bengal Legislative Assembly
- In office 11 May 2006 — 16 May 2009
- Preceded by: Hafiz Alam Sairani
- Succeeded by: Ali Imran Ramz
- Constituency: Goalpokhar

Working President, West Bengal Pradesh Congress Committee
- Incumbent
- Assumed office 2017

AICC Incharge for Kerala Pradesh Congress Committee, Lakshadweep Territorial Congress Committee
- Incumbent
- Assumed office 24 December 2023
- Preceded by: Tariq Anwar

Personal details
- Born: Deepa Ghosh; 15 July 1960 (age 66) Kolkata, West Bengal, India
- Party: Indian National Congress
- Spouse: Priya Ranjan Dasmunsi (m:1994-2017) (his death)
- Profession: Politician; Artist

Deepa Dasmunsi (née Ghosh; born 15 July 1960) is an Indian politician. She served as the member of parliament for Raiganj in the 15th Lok Sabha. She was the Minister of State for Urban Development from October 2012 until May 2014. She was the wife of Indian National Congress politician Priya Ranjan Dasmunsi, until his death in 2017.

== Early life ==
Dasmunsi was born on 15 July 1960 in Kolkata, West Bengal to Benoy Ghosh and Durga Ghosh. She was educated at the Rabindra Bharati University in Kolkata and earned an M.A. in dramatics.

She married Priya Ranjan Dasmunsi on 15 April 1994 and has a son.

== Positions held ==
1. 2006-2009 member, West Bengal Legislative Assembly for Goalpokhar

2. 2009-2014 elected to 15th Lok Sabha from Raiganj

3. 31 August 2009 Member, Parliamentary Committee on Personnel, Public Grievances, Law and Justice

4. 28 October 2012, Union Minister of State, Urban Development

5. 23 December 2023 - 2 February 2025 AICC Telangana in-charge

6. AICC Kerala in-charge - 2 February 2025.

== Accomplishments ==
Dasmunsi has been, among other careers, a stage performer since 1984, television artist, costume designer and art director (TV serials and short films).

== Sports and clubs ==
President, Delhi Women Football

== Other information ==
Gold medalist at the post-graduation level and won many awards in theatre.

== Education and career ==
Dasmunsi was educated at Rabindra Bharati University and is a post- graduate in dramatics. She was a gold medallist at the post-graduation level.

She was elected to the West Bengal state assembly in 2006 from the Goalpokhar. In 2009, she was elected to the 15th Lok Sabha and was a member on the Committee on Personnel, Public Grievances, Law and Justice. She was the Union Minister of State, Urban Development.

She has worked for the homeless street children, disabled children and tribal people.

== Interests ==
Dasmunsi enjoys reading books, gardening, cooking and listening to classical music as her pastime. She has widely travelled across the world and has also been the President of the Delhi Women Football association.
