= Gyanesh Kudaisya =

Indian historian

Gyanesh Kudaisya is a historian of modern South Asia whose main research focuses on the contemporary history of India. He is associate professor in the South Asian Studies Programme at the National University of Singapore. He was the head of the South Asian Studies Programme from 2006 to 2010. He has published extensively on the post 1947 history of South Asia. His works include A Republic in the Making, India in the 1950s, (Oxford University Press, 2017) which looks at the critical first decade of independent India.

Book Review in Outlook Book review in Business Standard

Kudaisya earlier worked in collaboration with the Singapore historian Tan Tai Yong on Partition and its aftermath. Together, they authored The Aftermath of Partition in South Asia, (London, Routledge, 2000) and edited the three-volume Partition and Post Colonial South Asia (Routledge, 2008)

Kudaisya has also written extensively on the political history of Uttar Pradesh. His work Region, Nation, Heartland: Uttar Pradesh in India's Body Politic (Sage, 2006) proposed the idea of dividing Uttar Pradesh into three different regions to make it governable. "With a deeply fragmented polity and a lack of cohesiveness in its political life, the time has come for Uttar Pradesh to rethink its status as a 'heartland'.[1] He argues that a beginning to this effect has been made with the creation of Uttaranchal, carved out of the hilly region of Uttar Pradesh, in November 2000. However, the process has to go much further."[2]

Kudaisya is currently working on the politics of states reorganisation in post-colonial India. He also served as a member of Singapore's first Indian Heritage Center which opened in 2016.

== Education ==
He was born in India and grew up in New Delhi and completed his schooling and undergraduate studies there. He completed MA and M Phil degrees from Jawaharlal Nehru University (New Delhi). He worked with Tata Consultancy Services (TCS) in New Delhi for three years as an editor and corporate communications professional. He was a Commonwealth Scholar at the University of Cambridge, where he obtained his Ph. D.

== Career ==
Prior to joining the South Asian Studies Programme in June 1999 at NUS, he was an assistant professor at the School of Arts in Nanyang Technological University. He was also a Fellow at the Nehru Memorial Museum and Library in New Delhi.

== Books/edited volumes (selection) ==
- A Republic in the Making, India in the 1950s, New Delhi, Oxford University Press, 2017.
- Partition and Post-colonial South Asia, (in three volumes), co-edited with Tai Yong Tan, London; New York : Routledge, 2008.
- Region, nation, "heartland": Uttar Pradesh in India's body-politic, Thousand Oaks, Calif.:Sage Publications, 2006.
- The Aftermath of Partition in South Asia, co-authored with Tai Yong Tan, London : Routledge, 2000.

== Major articles ==
- "In Aid of Civil Power: The Colonial Army in Northern India, c. 1919–1942", Journal of Imperial and Commonwealth History, Vol. 32, No. 1, January 2004 Frank Cass Publishers, London, UK.
- "Constructing the 'Heartland': Uttar Pradesh in India's Body-Politic", South Asia, Journal of South Asian Studies, New Series Vol. XXV, No. 2, August 2002, Special Issue, pp. 153–182. Taylor & Francis Publishers, London, UK.
