= Birodhi =

- Census Town
- Location in West Bengal, India Birodhi (India)
- Coordinates: 24.956611°N 87.978344°E
- Country: India
- State: West Bengal
- District: Malda

Population (2011)
  - Total: 3,838

Languages
  - Official: Bengali, English
- Time zone: UTC+5:30 (IST)
- PIN: 732207
- Telephone/ STD code: 03512
- Vehicle registration: WB
- Lok Sabha constituency: Maldaha Dakshin
- Vidhan Sabha constituency: Mothabari
- Website: malda.nic.in

Birodhi is a census town in the Kaliachak II CD block in the Malda Sadar subdivision of Malda district in the state of West Bengal, India.

== Geography ==
Cities, towns and locations in the southern portion of Malda district (including Kaliachak I, Kaliachak II, Kaliachak III, Manikchak and English Bazar CD blocks)
M: municipal town, CT: census town, R: rural/ urban centre, F: Facility, H: historical centre
Owing to space constraints in the small map, the actual locations in a larger map may vary slightly

=== Location ===
Birodhi is located at 24.956611°N 87.978344°E.

=== Area overview ===
The area shown in the adjoining map is the physiographic sub-region known as the diara. It "is a relatively well drained flat land formed by the fluvial deposition of newer alluvium." The most note-worthy feature is the Farakka Barrage across the Ganges. The area is a part of the Malda Sadar subdivision, which is an overwhelmingly rural region, but the area shown in the map has pockets of urbanization with 17 census towns, concentrated mostly in the Kaliachak I CD block. The bank of the Ganges between Bhutni and Panchanandapur (both the places are marked on the map), is the area worst hit by left bank erosion, a major problem in the Malda area. The ruins of Gauda, capital of several empires, is located in this area.

Note: The map alongside presents some of the notable locations in the area. All places marked in the map are linked in the larger full screen map.

== Demographics ==
According to the 2011 Census of India, Birodhi had a total population of 3,838, of which 1,944 (51%) were males and 1,894 (49%) were females. Population in the age range 0–6 years was 660. The total number of literate persons in Birodhi was 1,667 (52.45% of the population over 6 years).

== Infrastructure ==
According to the District Census Handbook, Maldah, 2011, Birodhi covered an area of 0.999 square kilometres (0.4 sq mi). The protected water-supply involved hand pump, tube well/ bore well. It had 100 domestic electric connections. Among the educational facilities, it had 3 primary schools, 1 middle school in town, the nearest secondary school at Panchanandapur 2 km (1.2 mi) away, the nearest senior secondary school at Bangitola 5 km (3.1 mi) away, the nearest general degree college at Malda 23 km (14 mi) away.
