= Baisnabnagar, Malda =

Baisnabnagar
- Village
- Location in West Bengal, India Baisnabnagar (India)
- Coordinates: 24.8402°N 87.9776°E
- Country: India
- State: West Bengal
- District: Malda

Population (2011)
  - Total: 15,695

Languages
  - Official: Bengali, English
- Time zone: UTC+5:30 (IST)
- PIN: 732202
- STD/ Telephone code: 03512
- Lok Sabha constituency: Maldaha Dakshin
- Vidhan Sabha constituency: Baisnabnagar
- Website: malda.nic.in

Baisnabnagar is a village in the Kaliachak III CD block in the Malda Sadar subdivision of Malda district in the state of West Bengal, India.

== Geography ==
Cities, towns and locations in the southern portion of Malda district (including Kaliachak I, Kaliachak II, Kaliachak III, Manikchak and English Bazar CD blocks)
M: municipal town, CT: census town, R: rural/ urban centre, F: Facility, H: historical centre
Owing to space constraints in the small map, the actual locations in a larger map may vary slightly

=== Location ===
Baisnabnagar is located at 24.8402°N 87.9776°E.

Dariapur with headquarters of Kaliachak III CD block, is located nearby.

=== Area overview ===
The area shown in the adjoining map is the physiographic sub-region known as the diara. It "is a relatively well drained flat land formed by the fluvial deposition of newer alluvium." The most note-worthy feature is the Farakka Barrage across the Ganges. The area is a part of the Malda Sadar subdivision, which is an overwhelmingly rural region, but the area shown in the map has pockets of urbanization with 17 census towns, concentrated mostly in the Kaliachak I CD block. The bank of the Ganges between Bhutni and Panchanandapur (both the places are marked on the map), is the area worst hit by left bank erosion, a major problem in the Malda area. The ruins of Gauda, capital of several empires, is located in this area.

Note: The map alongside presents some of the notable locations in the area. All places marked in the map are linked in the larger full screen map.

== Civic administration ==
=== Police station ===
Baisnabnagar police station under West Bengal police has jurisdiction over Kaliachak III CD Block.

== Demographics ==
According to the 2011 Census of India, Baisnabnagar had a total population of 15,695, of which 8,875 (57%) were males and 6,820 (43%) were females. Population in the age range 0–6 years was 2,424. The total number of literate persons in Baisnabnagar was 8,519 (64.19% of the population over 6 years).

== Transport ==
Baisnabnagar is on National Highway 12 (old number NH 34).

There is a station at nearby Chamagram on the New Farakka-Malda section of Howrah-New Jalpaiguri line.

== Healthcare ==
Bedrabad Rural Hospital at PO Baisnabnagar (with 30 beds) is the main medical facility in Kaliachak III CD block. There are primary health centres at Sabdalpur (Kumbhira PHC) (with 10 beds) and Gopalganj (with 10 beds).
