= Manikchak, Malda =

Village in Malda (West Bengal), India

Manikchak
- Village
- Location in West Bengal, India Manikchak (India)
- Coordinates: 25.081441°N 87.899111°E
- Country: India
- State: West Bengal
- District: Malda

Population (2011)
  - Total: 269,813

Languages
  - Official: Bengali, English
- Time zone: UTC+5:30 (IST)
- PIN: 732202
- STD/ Telephone code: 03512
- Lok Sabha constituency: Maldaha Dakshin
- Vidhan Sabha constituency: Manikchak
- Website: malda.nic.in

Manikchak is a village in the Manikchak CD block in the Malda Sadar subdivision of Malda district in the state of West Bengal, India.

== Geography ==
Cities, towns and locations in the southern portion of Malda district (including Kaliachak I, Kaliachak II, Kaliachak III, Manikchak and English Bazar CD blocks)
M: municipal town, CT: census town, R: rural/ urban centre, F: Facility, H: historical centre
Owing to space constraints in the small map, the actual locations in a larger map may vary slightly

=== Location ===
Manikchak is located at 25.081441°N 87.899111°E

=== Area overview ===
The area shown in the adjoining map is the physiographic sub-region known as the diara. It "is a relatively well drained flat land formed by the fluvial deposition of newer alluvium." The most note-worthy feature is the Farakka Barrage across the Ganges. The area is a part of the Malda Sadar subdivision, which is an overwhelmingly rural region, but the area shown in the map has pockets of urbanization with 17 census towns, concentrated mostly in the Kaliachak I CD block. The bank of the Ganges between Bhutni and Panchanandapur (both the places are marked on the map), is the area worst hit by left bank erosion, a major problem in the Malda area. The ruins of Gauda, capital of several empires, is located in this area.

Note: The map alongside presents some of the notable locations in the area. All places marked in the map are linked in the larger full screen map.

== Civic administration ==
=== Police station ===
Manikchak police station under West Bengal police has jurisdiction over Manikchak CD block.

=== CD block HQ ===
The headquarters of Manikchak CD block is at Manikchak.

== Demographics ==
According to the 2011 Census of India, Manikchak had a total population of 4,038, of which 2,103 (52%) were males and 1,935 (48%) were females. Population in the age range 0–6 years was 700. The total number of literate persons in Manikchak was 2,181 (65.34% of the population over 6 years).

== Transport ==
State Highway 10 connects Manickchak to National Highway 12 (old number NH 34) at Malda and National Highway 131A at Ratua.

There is a private ferry service operating between Manikchak ferry ghat and Sahibganj ferry ghat, across the Ganges, in Jharkhand. Around 15,000 to 20,000 people use the ferry on weekdays.

== Education ==
Manikchak College at Mathurapur, established in 2014, is affiliated to the University of Gour Banga. It offers an honours course in Bengali and a general course in arts.

== Healthcare ==
Manikchak Rural Hospital at Manikchak with 30 beds is the main medical facility in Manikchak CD Block. There are primary health centres at Bhutni (with 10 beds), Mathurapur (with 4 beds) and Nurpur (with 4 beds).
