= Pubarun =

Pubarun Khejuria
- Populated place
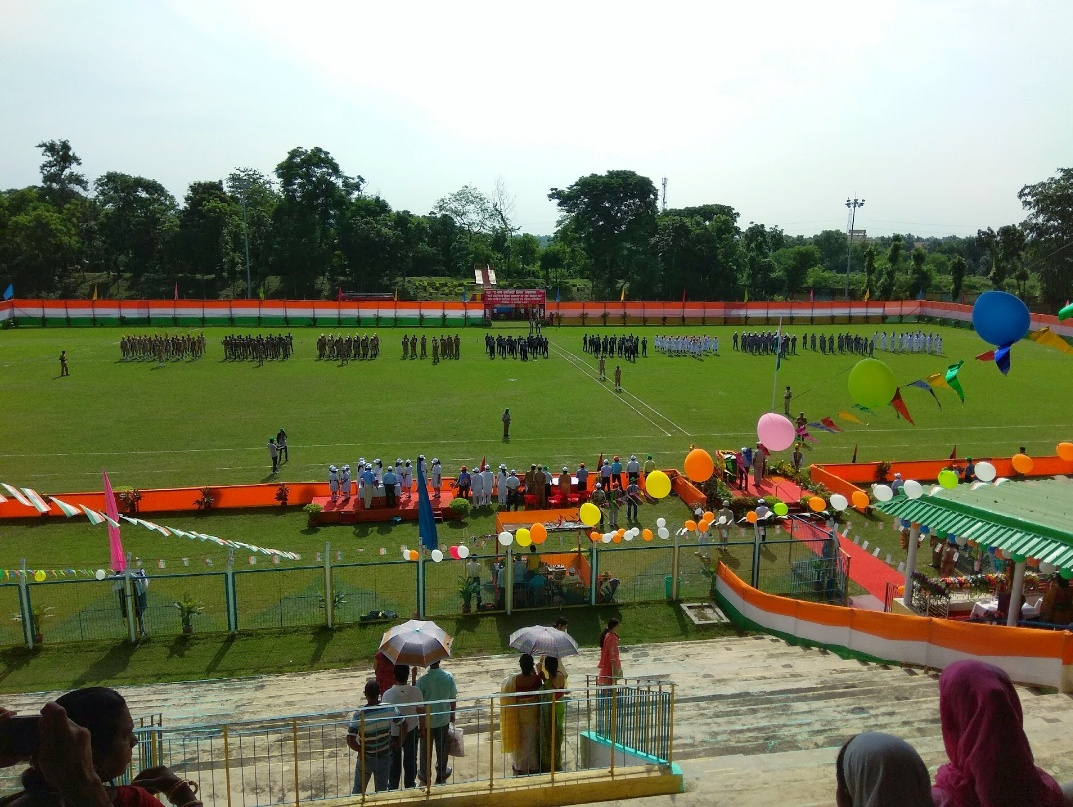
- NTPC Stadium

- Location in West Bengal, India Pubarun (India)
- Coordinates: 24.81507°N 87.95482°E
- Country: India
- State: West Bengal
- District: Malda

Languages
  - Official: Bengali, English
- Time zone: UTC+5:30 (IST)
- PIN: 732315
- Telephone/ STD code: 03512
- Vehicle registration: WB
- Lok Sabha constituency: Maldaha Dakshin
- Vidhan Sabha constituency: Baisnabnagar
- Website: malda.nic.in

Pubarun is a populated place, not identified as a separate place in 2011 census, in the Kaliachak III CD block in the Malda Sadar subdivision of Malda district in the state of West Bengal, India.

== Geography ==
Cities, towns and locations in the southern portion of Malda district (including Kaliachak I, Kaliachak II, Kaliachak III, Manikchak and English Bazar CD blocks)
M: municipal town, CT: census town, R: rural/ urban centre, F: Facility, H: historical centre
Owing to space constraints in the small map, the actual locations in a larger map may vary slightly

=== Location ===
Pubarun is located at 24.81507°N 87.95482°E.

=== Area overview ===
The area shown in the adjoining map is the physiographic sub-region known as the diara. It "is a relatively well drained flat land formed by the fluvial deposition of newer alluvium." The most note-worthy feature is the Farakka Barrage across the Ganges. The area is a part of the Malda Sadar subdivision, which is an overwhelmingly rural region, but the area shown in the map has pockets of urbanization with 17 census towns, concentrated mostly in the Kaliachak I CD block. The bank of the Ganges between Bhutni and Panchanandapur (both the places are marked on the map), is the area worst hit by left bank erosion, a major problem in the Malda area. The ruins of Gauda, capital of several empires, is located in this area.

Note: The map alongside presents some of the notable locations in the area. All places marked in the map are linked in the larger full screen map.

== Education ==
South Malda College was established in 1995 at Pubarun. Affiliated with the University of Gour Banga, it offers honours courses in Arabic, Bengali, English, economics, education, geography, history, political science, sociology (all for arts), accountancy (commerce), and general courses in arts and commerce.

== Sports ==
Netaji Subhas Chandra Bose Stadium is located in the NTPC township in Malda.
