= Mathabari =

Mothabari Mothabari
- Sub-Urban
- Location in West Bengal, India Mothabari (India)
- Coordinates: 24.934611°N 88.042544°E
- Country: India
- State: West Bengal
- District: Malda

Population (2011)
  - Total: 9,884

Languages
  - Official: Bengali, English
- Time zone: UTC+5:30 (IST)
- PIN: 732207
- STD/ Telephone code: 03512
- Lok Sabha constituency: Malda Dakshin
- Vidhan Sabha constituency: 52. Mothabari
- Website: malda.nic.in

Mothabari is a village in the Kaliachak II CD block in the Malda Sadar subdivision of Malda district in the state of West Bengal, India.

== Geography ==
Cities, towns and locations in the southern portion of Malda district (including Kaliachak I, Kaliachak II, Kaliachak III, Manikchak and English Bazar CD blocks)
M: municipal town, CT: census town, R: rural/ urban centre, F: Facility, H: historical centre
Owing to space constraints in the small map, the actual locations in a larger map may vary slightly

=== Location ===
Mothabari is located at 24.934611°N 88.042544°E.

=== Area overview ===
The area shown in the adjoining map is the physiographic sub-region known as the diara. It "is a relatively well drained flat land formed by the fluvial deposition of newer alluvium." The most note-worthy feature is the Farakka Barrage across the Ganges. The area is a part of the Malda Sadar subdivision, which is an overwhelmingly rural region, but the area shown in the map has pockets of urbanization with 17 census towns, concentrated mostly in the Kaliachak I CD block. The bank of the Ganges between Bhutni and Panchanandapur (both the places are marked on the map), is the area worst hit by left bank erosion, a major problem in the Malda area. The ruins of Gauda, capital of several empires, is located in this area.

Note: The map alongside presents some of the notable locations in the area. All places marked in the map are linked in the larger full screen map.

== Civic administration ==
=== CD block HQ ===
The headquarters of Kaliachak II CD block is at Mothabari.

== Demographics ==
According to the 2011 Census of India, Mothabari had a total population of 9,884, of which 5,011 (51%) were males and 4,873 (49%) were females. Population in the age range 0–6 years was 1,510. The total number of literate persons in Mothabari was 6,195 (73.98% of the population over 6 years).

== Transport ==
Mothabari-Gangaprasad Road links it to National Highway 12 (old number NH 34).

== Education ==
Mothabari High School H.S., founded in 1949, is a Bengali-medium co-educational higher secondary school, with facilities for teaching from Class VI to Class XII. It has 18 computers, facilities for computer-aided education, 2,000 books in the library and a play ground etc. Abbasganj High Madrasah H.S., Mothabari, Malda

== Healthcare ==
Bangitola Rural Hospital at Bangitola (with 30 beds) is the main medical facility in Kaliachak II CD Block. There are Primary Health Centres at Mothabari (with 10 Beds) and Rajnagar (Hamidpur PHC) (with 5 Beds).
