= Krishnapur, Malda =

Krishnapur
- Census Town
- Location in West Bengal, India Krishnapur (India)
- Coordinates: 24.7929°N 87.9947°E
- Country: India
- State: West Bengal
- District: Malda

Area
  - Total: 9.9188 km^{2} (3.8297 sq mi)

Population (2011)
  - Total: 16,470

Languages
  - Official: Bengali
  - Additional official: English
- PIN: 732201
- Telephone/ STD code: 03512
- Vehicle registration: WB
- Lok Sabha constituency: Maldaha Dakshin
- Vidhan Sabha constituency: Baisnabnagar
- Website: malda.nic.in

Krishnapur is a census town in the Kaliachak III CD block in the Malda Sadar subdivision of Malda district in the Indian state of West Bengal.

== Geography ==
Cities, towns and locations in the southern portion of Malda district (including Kaliachak I, Kaliachak II, Kaliachak III, Manikchak and English Bazar CD blocks)
M: municipal town, CT: census town, R: rural/ urban centre, F: Facility, H: historical centre
Owing to space constraints in the small map, the actual locations in a larger map may vary slightly

=== Location ===
Krishnapur is located by the coordinate of 24.7929°N 87.9947°E

=== Area overview ===
The area shown in the adjoining map is the physiographic sub-region known as the diara. It “is a relatively well drained flat land formed by the fluvial deposition of newer alluvium.” The most note-worthy feature is the Farakka Barrage across the Ganges. The area is a part of the Malda Sadar subdivision, which is an overwhelmingly rural region, but the area shown in the map has pockets of urbanization with 17 census towns, concentrated mostly in the Kaliachak I CD block. The bank of the Ganges between Bhutni and Panchanandapur (both the places are marked on the map), is the area worst hit by left bank erosion, a major problem in the Malda area. The ruins of Gauda, capital of several empires, is located in this area.

Note: The map alongside presents some of the notable locations in the area. All places marked in the map are linked in the larger full screen map.

== Demographics ==
According to the 2011 Census of India, Krishnapur had a total population of 16,470, of which 8,370 (51%) were males and 8,100 (49%) were females. Population in the age range 0–6 years was 2,931. The total number of literate persons in Krishnapur was 6,732 (49.72% of the population over 6 years).

== Infrastructure ==
According to the District Census Handbook, Maldah, 2011, Krishnapur covered an area of 9.9188 km^{2}. It had 10 km roads with both open and closed drains. The protected water-supply involved overhead tank, tap water from treated sources, tube well/ bore well. It had 1,330 domestic electric connections. Among the medical facilities it had 12 medicine shops. Among the educational facilities, it had 8 primary schools, 1 middle school, 1 secondary school in town, the nearest general degree college at Malda 33 km away. It had the branch office of 1 cooperative bank.
