= Bagbari =

- Census Town
- Location in West Bengal, India Bagbari (India)
- Coordinates: 25.01506°N 88.11676°E
- Country: India
- State: West Bengal
- District: Malda

Area
  - Total: 3.1306 km^{2} (1.2087 sq mi)

Population (2011)
  - Total: 8,660
  - Density: 2,770/km^{2} (7,160/sq mi)

Languages
  - Official: Bengali, English
- Time zone: UTC+5:30 (IST)
- PIN: 732202
- Telephone/ STD code: 03512
- Vehicle registration: WB
- Lok Sabha constituency: Maldaha Dakshin
- Vidhan Sabha constituency: English Bazar
- Website: malda.nic.in

Bagbari is a census town in the English Bazar CD block in the Malda Sadar subdivision of Malda district in the state of West Bengal, India.

== Geography ==
Cities, towns and locations in the southern portion of Malda district (including Kaliachak I, Kaliachak II, Kaliachak III, Manikchak and English Bazar CD blocks)
M: municipal town, CT: census town, R: rural/ urban centre, F: Facility, H: historical centre
Owing to space constraints in the small map, the actual locations in a larger map may vary slightly

=== Location ===
Bagbari is located at 25.01506°N 88.11676°E.

=== Area overview ===
The area shown in the adjoining map is the physiographic sub-region known as the diara. It "is a relatively well drained flat land formed by the fluvial deposition of newer alluvium." The most note-worthy feature is the Farakka Barrage across the Ganges. The area is a part of the Malda Sadar subdivision, which is an overwhelmingly rural region, but the area shown in the map has pockets of urbanization with 17 census towns, concentrated mostly in the Kaliachak I CD block. The bank of the Ganges between Bhutni and Panchanandapur (both the places are marked on the map), is the area worst hit by left bank erosion, a major problem in the Malda area. The ruins of Gauda, capital of several empires, is located in this area.

Note: The map alongside presents some of the notable locations in the area. All places marked in the map are linked in the larger full screen map.

== Demographics ==
According to the 2011 Census of India, Bagbari had a total population of 8,660, of which 4,574 (53%) were males and 4,086 (47%) were females. Population in the age range 0–6 years was 1,279. The total number of literate persons in Bagbari was 4,700 (63.68% of the population over 6 years).

== Infrastructure ==
According to the District Census Handbook, Maldah, 2011, Bagbari covered an area of 3.1306 km^{2}. The protected water-supply involved river infiltration gallery, tube well/ bore well, hand pump. It had 1,200 domestic electric connections, 10 road lighting points. Among the medical facilities it had 2 dispensaries/ health centres, 1 nursing home (with 10 beds), 1 charitable hospital/ nursing home. Among the educational facilities, it had 3 primary schools, 1 middle school, 1 secondary school, 1 senior secondary school, the nearest general degree college at English Bazar 4 km away. It had 1 recognised typewriting, shorthand & vocational training centre, 3 non-formal education centres (Sarva Shiksha Abhiyan). It had a wheat mill. It had branch offices of 2 agricultural credit societies.
