= Sonatala, Malda =

Sonatala
- Census Town
- Location in West Bengal, India Sonatala (India)
- Coordinates: 24.98736°N 88.11746°E
- Country: India
- State: West Bengal
- District: Malda

Area
  - Total: 3.6791 km^{2} (1.4205 sq mi)

Population (2011)
  - Total: 10,589
  - Density: 2,878.1/km^{2} (7,454.4/sq mi)

Languages
  - Official: Bengali, English
- Time zone: UTC+5:30 (IST)
- PIN: 732208
- Telephone/ STD code: 03512
- Vehicle registration: WB
- Lok Sabha constituency: Maldaha Dakshin
- Vidhan Sabha constituency: English Bazar
- Website: malda.nic.in

Sonatala is a census town in the English Bazar CD block in the Malda Sadar subdivision of Malda district in the state of West Bengal, India.

== Geography ==
Cities, towns and locations in the southern portion of Malda district (including Kaliachak I, Kaliachak II, Kaliachak III, Manikchak and English Bazar CD blocks)
M: municipal town, CT: census town, R: rural/ urban centre, F: Facility, H: historical centre
Owing to space constraints in the small map, the actual locations in a larger map may vary slightly

=== Location ===
Sonatala is located at 24.98736°N 88.11746°E.

=== Area overview ===
The area shown in the adjoining map is the physiographic sub-region known as the diara. It "is a relatively well drained flat land formed by the fluvial deposition of newer alluvium." The most note-worthy feature is the Farakka Barrage across the Ganges. The area is a part of the Malda Sadar subdivision, which is an overwhelmingly rural region, but the area shown in the map has pockets of urbanization with 17 census towns, concentrated mostly in the Kaliachak I CD block. The bank of the Ganges between Bhutni and Panchanandapur (both the places are marked on the map), is the area worst hit by left bank erosion, a major problem in the Malda area. The ruins of Gauda, capital of several empires, is located in this area.

Note: The map alongside presents some of the notable locations in the area. All places marked in the map are linked in the larger full screen map.

== Demographics ==
According to the 2011 Census of India, Sonatala had a total population of 10,589, of which 5,309 (50%) were males and 5,280 (50%) were females. Population in the age range 0–6 years was 1,450. The total number of literate persons in Sonatala was 5,585 (61.11% of the population over 6 years).

== Infrastructure ==
According to the District Census Handbook, Maldah, 2011, Sonatala covered an area of 3.6791 km^{2}. The protected water-supply involved river infiltration gallery, tap water from treated sources, hand pump. It had 1,329 domestic electric connections. Among the medical facilities it had 1 dispensary/ health centre, 1 family welfare centre, 3 medicine shops. Among the educational facilities, it had 6 primary schools, other school facilities at Niamatpur 1.5 km away, the nearest general degree college at Malda 12 km away. It had 2 non-formal education centres (Sarva Shiksha Abhiyan). Among the social, cultural and recreational facilities it had 1 public library, 1 reading room. It produced mango, mango pickle. It had branch offices of 1 nationalised bank, 1 agricultural credit society.
