= Malda Sadar subdivision =

- Subdivision
- Interactive map of Malda Sadar subdivision
- Coordinates: 25.00°N 88.15°E
- Country: India
- State: West Bengal
- District: Malda
- Headquarters: Malda City

Languages
  - Official: Bengali, English
- Time zone: UTC+5:30 (IST)
- ISO 3166 code: ISO 3166-2:IN

Malda Sadar subdivision is an administrative subdivision of the Malda district in the Indian state of West Bengal.

== Geography ==
Malda Sadar subdivision covers both the Barind Tract and the Diara, two of the three physiographic subregions of the district. The Barind “is made up of the ancient alluvial humps that are remnants of old riverine flood plains that remained unaffected subsequently by inundation and renewed silting.” It forms an upland slightly higher than the surrounding areas and extends beyond the borders of the district. “The Diara is a relatively well drained flat land formed by the fluvial deposition of newer alluvium in the transitional zone between the Barind upland and the marshy Tal tract. The soil is light with sandy appearance and is very fertile.

== Subdivisions ==
Malda district is divided into two administrative subdivisions:

Subdivision	Headquarters	Area km^{2}	Population (2011)	Urban population % (2011)	Rural Population % (2011)
Malda Sadar	Malda City	2,515.43	2,650,466	20.23	79.77
Chanchal	Chanchal	1,160.44	1,338,379	10.42	88.58
Malda district	English Bazar	3,733.00	3,988,845	13.58	86.42

== Administrative units ==
Malda Sadar subdivision has 9 police stations, 9 community development blocks, 9 panchayat samitis, 97 gram panchayats, 1,274 mouzas, 1,105 inhabited villages, 2 municipalities and 26 census towns. The municipalities are at English Bazar and Old Malda. The census towns are: Bandhail, Rangabhita, Baksinagar, Kachu Pukur, Kendua, Aiho, Jhangra, Chhatinamor, Sahapur, Milki, Sonatala, Bagbari, Chhota Suzapur, Bara Suzapur, Chaspara, Nazirpur, Jalalpur, Bamangram, Jadupur, Silampur, Baliadanga, Alipur, Karari Chandpur, Birodhi, Jagannathpur and Krishnapur. The subdivision has its headquarters at English Bazar.

Cities, towns and locations in the northern portion of Malda district (including Chanchal subdivision and Old Malda, Habibpur, Bamangola and Gazole CD blocks)
M: municipal town, CT: census town, R: rural/ urban centre, F: Facility, H: historical centre
Owing to space constraints in the small map, the actual locations in a larger map may vary slightly
Cities, towns and locations in the southern portion of Malda district (including Kaliachak I, Kaliachak II, Kaliachak III, Manikchak and English Bazar CD blocks)
M: municipal town, CT: census town, R: rural/ urban centre, F: Facility, H: historical centre
Owing to space constraints in the small map, the actual locations in a larger map may vary slightly

== Police stations ==
Police stations in Malda Sadar subdivision have the following features and jurisdiction:

Police station	Area covered (km^{2})	Border (km)	Municipal town/ city	CD Block
Gazole	n/a	-	-	Gazole
Bamangola	n/a	n/a	-	Bamangola
Habibpur	n/a	n/a	-	Habibpur
Malda	n/a	n/a	Old Malda	Old Malda
English Bazar	n/a	n/a	English Bazar	English Bazar
English Bazar Women	n/a	n/a	-	-
Manikchak	n/a	-	-	Manikchak
Kaliachak	n/a	-	-	Kaliachak I, Kaliachak II
Baisnabnagar	n/a	n/a	-	Kaliachak III
Bhutni	n/a	-	-	n/a

== Gram panchayats ==
The subdivision contains 97 gram panchayats under 9 community development blocks:

- English Bazar block consists of 11 gram panchayats, viz. Amriti, Jadupur–I, Kotwali, Narhatta, Binodpur, Jadupur–II, Mahadipur, Sovanagar, Fulbaria, Kajigram and Milki.
- Gazole block consists of 15 gram panchayats, viz. Alal, Chaknagar, Karkach, Raniganj–II, Bairgachhi–I, Deotala, Majhra, Sahajadpur, Bairgachhi–II, Gazole–I, Pandua, Salaidanga, Babupur, Gazole–II and Raniganj–I.
- Habibpur block consists of 11 gram panchayats, viz. Aktail, Bulbulchandi, Jajail, Rishipur, Aiho, Dhumpur, Kanturka, Sreerampur, Baidyapur, Habibpur and Mangalpur.
- Kaliachak I block consists of 14 gram panchayats, viz. Alinagar, Gayeshbari, Kaliachak–II, Silampur–II, Alipur–I, Jalalpur, Mozampur, Sujapur, Alipur–II, Jaluabadhal, Naoda–Jadupur, Bamongram–Mashimpur, Kaliachak–I, Silampur–I.
- Kaliachak II block consists of 9 gram panchayats, viz. Bangitola, Rajnagar, Uttar Lakshmipur, Gangaprasad, Rathbari, Uttar Panchanandapur–II, Hamidpur, Uttar Panchanandapur–I and Mothabari.ayet.
- Kaliachak III block consists of 14 gram panchayats, viz. Akandabaria, Bhagabanpur, Lakshmipur, Bakhrabad, Charianantapur, Pardeonapur–Sovapur, Bedrabad iu, Golapganj, Beernagar–I, Krishnapur, Sahabajpur, Beernagar–II, Kumbhira, Sahabanchak.
- Manikchak block consists of 11 gram panchayats, viz. Chowki Mirdadpur, Enayetpur, Manikchak, Nurpur, Dakshin Chandipur, Gopalpur, Mathurapur, Uttar Chandipur, Dharampur, Heeranandapur and Nazeerpur.
- Old Malda block consists of 6 gram panchayats, viz. Bhabuk, Mahisbathani, Muchia, Jatradanga, Mangalbari and Sahapur.
- Bamangola block consists of 6 gram panchayats, viz. Bamangola, Gobindapur–Maheshpur, Jagdala, Pakuahat, Chandpur and Madnabati.

== Blocks ==
Community development blocks in Malda Sadar subdivision are:

CD Block	Headquarters	Area km^{2}	Population (2011)	SC %	ST %	Hindus %	Muslims %	Literacy rate %	Census Towns
Gazole	Gazole	513.73	343,830	37.36	19.94	75.53	22.28	63.07	2
Bamangola	Pakuahat	206.20	143,906	49.46	20.15	88.08	8.87	68.09	-
Habibpur	Habibpur	397.10	210,669	50.02	29.11	91.06	1.23	58.81	4
Old Malda	Narayanpur	228.00	156,365	32.16	15.05	71.25	26.36	59.61	3
English Bazar	Malda	251.85	274,627	17.31	1.89	50.43	49.53	63.03	3
Manikchak	Manikchak	316.39	269,813	27.73	14.87	57.28	42.68	57.77	-
Kaliachak I	Kaliachak	106.60	392,517	3.83	0.39	11.54	88.39	65.25	11
Kaliachak II	Mothabari	209.17	210,105	15.56	2.29	32.42	67.53	64.89	1
Kaliachak III	Dariapur	127.37	359,071	29.44	7.05	52.17	47.70	54.16	2

== Education ==
Malda district had a literacy rate of 61.73% (for population of 7 years and above) as per the census of India 2011. Malda Sadar subdivision had a literacy rate of 63.76% and Chanchal subdivision 57.68%.

Given in the table below is a comprehensive picture of the education scenario in Malda district for the year 2013-14:

Subdivision	Primary School		Middle School		High School		Higher Secondary School		General College, Univ		Technical / Professional Instt		Non-formal Education	
Subdivision	Institution	Student	Institution	Student	Institution	Student	Institution	Student	Institution	Student	Institution	Student	Institution	Student
Malda Sadar	1,334	198,126	116	28,270	74	130,124	143	270,490	8	33,233	20	2,947	4,518	167,244
Chanchal	608	130,248	69	14,113	54	84,638	65	122,173	3	9,846	1	100	1,794	105,051
Malda district	1,942	328,374	185	42,383	128	214,762	208	392,663	11	43,079	21	3,047	6,312	272,295

Note: Primary schools include junior basic schools; middle schools, high schools and higher secondary schools include madrasahs; technical schools include junior technical schools, junior government polytechnics, industrial technical institutes, industrial training centres, nursing training institutes etc.; technical and professional colleges include engineering colleges, medical colleges, para-medical institutes, management colleges, teachers training and nursing training colleges, law colleges, art colleges, music colleges etc. Special and non-formal education centres include sishu siksha kendras, madhyamik siksha kendras, centres of Rabindra mukta vidyalaya, recognised Sanskrit tols, institutions for the blind and other handicapped persons, Anganwadi centres, reformatory schools etc.

=== Educational institutions ===
The following institutions are located in the Malda Sadar subdivision:

- University of Gour Banga was established at PO Mokdumpur, Malda, in 2008.
- Malda College was established at Malda in 1944.
- Gour Mahavidyalaya was established at Mangal Bari, Old Malda in 1985.
- South Malda College was established at Pubarun, Laksmipur, Kaliachak III, in 1995.
- Kaliachak College was established at Sultanganj, Kaliachak I, in 1995.
- Pakuahat Degree College was established in 1997 at Pakuahat.
- Gazole Mahavidyalaya was established at Gazole Town in 2006.
- Manikchak College was established at Mathurapur, Manikchak, in 2014.
- Ghani Khan Choudhury Institute of Engineering & Technology was established at Narayanpur, Old Malda, in 2010. It offers degree and diploma courses in engineering.
- IMPS College of Engineering and Technology was established in 2003 at Malda.
- Malda Medical College and Hospital was established at Malda in 2011.

== Healthcare ==
The table below (all data in numbers) presents an overview of the medical facilities available and patients treated in the hospitals, health centres and sub-centres in 2014 in Malda district.

Subdivision	Health & Family Welfare Deptt, WB				Other State Govt Deptts	Local bodies	Central Govt Deptts / PSUs	NGO / Private Nursing Homes	Total	Total Number of Beds	Total Number of Doctors*	Indoor Patients	Outdoor Patients
Subdivision	Hospitals	Rural Hospitals	Block Primary Health Centres	Primary Health Centres	Other State Govt Deptts	Local bodies	Central Govt Deptts / PSUs	NGO / Private Nursing Homes	Total	Total Number of Beds	Total Number of Doctors*	Indoor Patients	Outdoor Patients
Malda Sadar	1	9	1	21	2	1	1	28	70	2,241	321	59,798	1,655,481
Chanchal	1	3	3	13	-	-	-	1	21	411	53	54,733	1,082,292
Malda district	2	12	4	34	2	1	7	29	91	2,652	374	114,531	2,737,773

.* Excluding nursing homes

=== Medical facilities ===
Medical facilities available in Malda Sadar subdivision are as follows:
Hospitals: (Name, location, beds)
Malda District Hospital, English Bazar, 600 beds
Malda Railway Hospital, English Bazar, 100 beds
English Bazar Police Hospital, English Bazar, 30 beds
Raja Sarat Chandra TB Hospital, English Bazar, 30 beds
EBM Matri Sadan, English Bazar, 15 beds
Malda District Correctional Home Hospital, English Bazar, 10 beds
Rural Hospitals: (Name, block, location, beds)
Manikchak Rural Hospital, Manikchak CD Block, Manikchak, 30 beds
Gazole Rural Hospital, Gazole CD Block, Gazole, 30 beds
R.N.Roy Rural Hospital, Habibpur CD Block, Bulbulchandi, 30 beds
Bamangola Rural Hospital, Bamangola CD Block, Maheshpur, 30 beds
Hatimari Rural Hospital, Gazole CD Block, Hatimari, 30 beds
Moulpur Rural Hospital, Old Malda (M), Old Malda, 30 beds
Milki Rural Hospital, English Bazar CD Block, Milki, 30 beds
Silampur Rural Hospital, Kaliachak I CD Block, Silampur, PO Kaliachak, 30 beds
Bangitola Rural Hospital, Kaliachak II CD Block, Bangitola, 30 beds
Bedrabad Rural Hospital, Kaliachak III CD Block, Bedrabad, PO Baisnabnagar, 30 beds
Primary Health Centres: (CD Block-wise)(CD Block, PHC location, beds)
Manikchak CD Block: Bhutni (10), Mathurapur (4), Nurpur (4)
Gazole CD Block: Babupur (4), Kutubshahar (Pandua PHC) (10 ), Purba Ranipur (Ranipur PHC) (10)
Habibpur CD Block: Manikora (Bahadurpur PHC) (10), Goramary (Rishipur PHC) (4)
Bamangola CD Block: Ashrampur (Kashimpur PHC) (4), Nalagola (Uttar Nayapara PHC) (10)
Old Malda CD Block: Jatradanga (6), Mahadevpur (Muchia PHC) (10)
English Bazar CD Block: KG Chandipur (Chandipur PHC) (10), Mahadipur (10)
Kaliachak I CD Block: Sujapur (10), Jadupur (Naoda-Jadupur PHC) (2), Pirojpur (Narayanpur PHC) (2)
Kaliachak II CD Block: Rajnagar (Hamidpur PHC) (4), Mothabari (10)
Kaliachak III CD Block: Sabdalpur (Kumbhira PHC) (10), Gopalganj (10)

== Electoral constituencies ==
Lok Sabha (parliamentary) and Vidhan Sabha (state assembly) constituencies in Malda Sadar subdivision were as follows:

Lok Sabha constituency	Reservation	Vidhan Sabha constituency	Reservation	CD Block and/or Gram panchayats and/or municipal areas
Maldaha Uttar	None	Habibpur	ST	Bamangola CD Block and Aktail, Baidyapur, Bulbul Chandi, Dhumpur, Habibpur, Jajail, Kanturka and Mangalpur gram panchayats of Habibpur CD Block
		Gazole	SC	Gazole CD Block
		Maldaha	SC	Old Maldah municipality, Old Malda) CD Block, Narhatta gram panchayat of English Bazar CD Block, and Aiho, Rishipur and Sreerampur gram panchayats of Habibpur CD Block
		Other four assembly segments in Chanchal subdivision		
Maldaha Dakshin	None	Manikchak	None	Manikchak CD Block, and Milki, Fulbaria and Sovanagar gram panchayats of English Bazar CD Block
		English Bazar	None	English Bazar municipality and Amriti, Binodpur, Jadupur I, Jadupur II, Kajigram, Kotwali and Mahadipur gram panchayats of English Bazar CD Block
		Mothabari	None	Kaliachak II CD Block, and Alinagar and Kaliachak I gram panchayats of Kaliachak I CD Block
		Sujapur	None	Alipur I, Alipur II, Bamongram Mashimpur, Gayeshbari, Jalalpur, Jalua Badhal, Kalia Chak II, Mozampur, Naoda Jadupur, Silampur I, Silampur II and Sujapur gram panchayats of Kaliachak I CD Block
		Baisnabnagar	None	Kaliachak III CD Block
		Other two assembly sehments in Murshidabad district		
