= Bangitola =

- Populated place
- Location in West Bengal, India Bangitola (India)
- Coordinates: 24.976611°N 88.002544°E
- Country: India
- State: West Bengal
- District: Malda

Languages
  - Official: Bengali, English
- Time zone: UTC+5:30 (IST)
- PIN: 732207
- Telephone/ STD code: 03512
- Vehicle registration: WB
- Lok Sabha constituency: Maldaha Dakshin
- Vidhan Sabha constituency: Mothabari
- Website: malda.nic.in

Bangitola is a populated place, not identified as a separate place in 2011 census, in the Kaliachak II CD block in the Malda Sadar subdivision of Malda district in the state of West Bengal, India.

== Geography ==
Cities, towns and locations in the southern portion of Malda district (including Kaliachak I, Kaliachak II, Kaliachak III, Manikchak and English Bazar CD blocks)
M: municipal town, CT: census town, R: rural/ urban centre, F: Facility, H: historical centre
Owing to space constraints in the small map, the actual locations in a larger map may vary slightly

=== Location ===
Bangitola is located at 24.976611°N 88.002544°E.

Bangitola is a gram panchayat.

=== Area overview ===
The area shown in the adjoining map is the physiographic sub-region known as the diara. It "is a relatively well drained flat land formed by the fluvial deposition of newer alluvium." The most note-worthy feature is the Farakka Barrage across the Ganges. The area is a part of the Malda Sadar subdivision, which is an overwhelmingly rural region, but the area shown in the map has pockets of urbanization with 17 census towns, concentrated mostly in the Kaliachak I CD block. The bank of the Ganges between Bhutni and Panchanandapur (both the places are marked on the map), is the area worst hit by left bank erosion, a major problem in the Malda area. The ruins of Gauda, capital of several empires, is located in this area.

Note: The map alongside presents some of the notable locations in the area. All places marked in the map are linked in the larger full screen map.

== Education ==
Bangitola High School is a Bengali-medium coeducational institution, established in 1937. It has facilities for teaching from class V to class XII. It has a playground, a library with 1,200 books and 16 computers for teaching and learning purposes.

== Healthcare ==
Bangitola Rural Hospital, with 30 beds, is the main government medical facility in Kaliachak II CD block.
