= Manikchak =

- Community development block
- Interactive map of Manikchak
- Coordinates: 25.0624410°N 87.9091110°E
- Country: India
- State: West Bengal
- District: Malda

Government
  - Type: Representative democracy

Area
  - Total: 316.39 km^{2} (122.16 sq mi)

Population (2011)
  - Total: 269,813
  - Density: 852.79/km^{2} (2,208.7/sq mi)

Languages
  - Official: Bengali, English
- Time zone: UTC+5:30 (IST)
- PIN: 732202
- STD/telephone code: 03512
- Lok Sabha constituency: Maldaha Dakshin
- Vidhan Sabha constituency: Manikchak
- Website: malda.nic.in

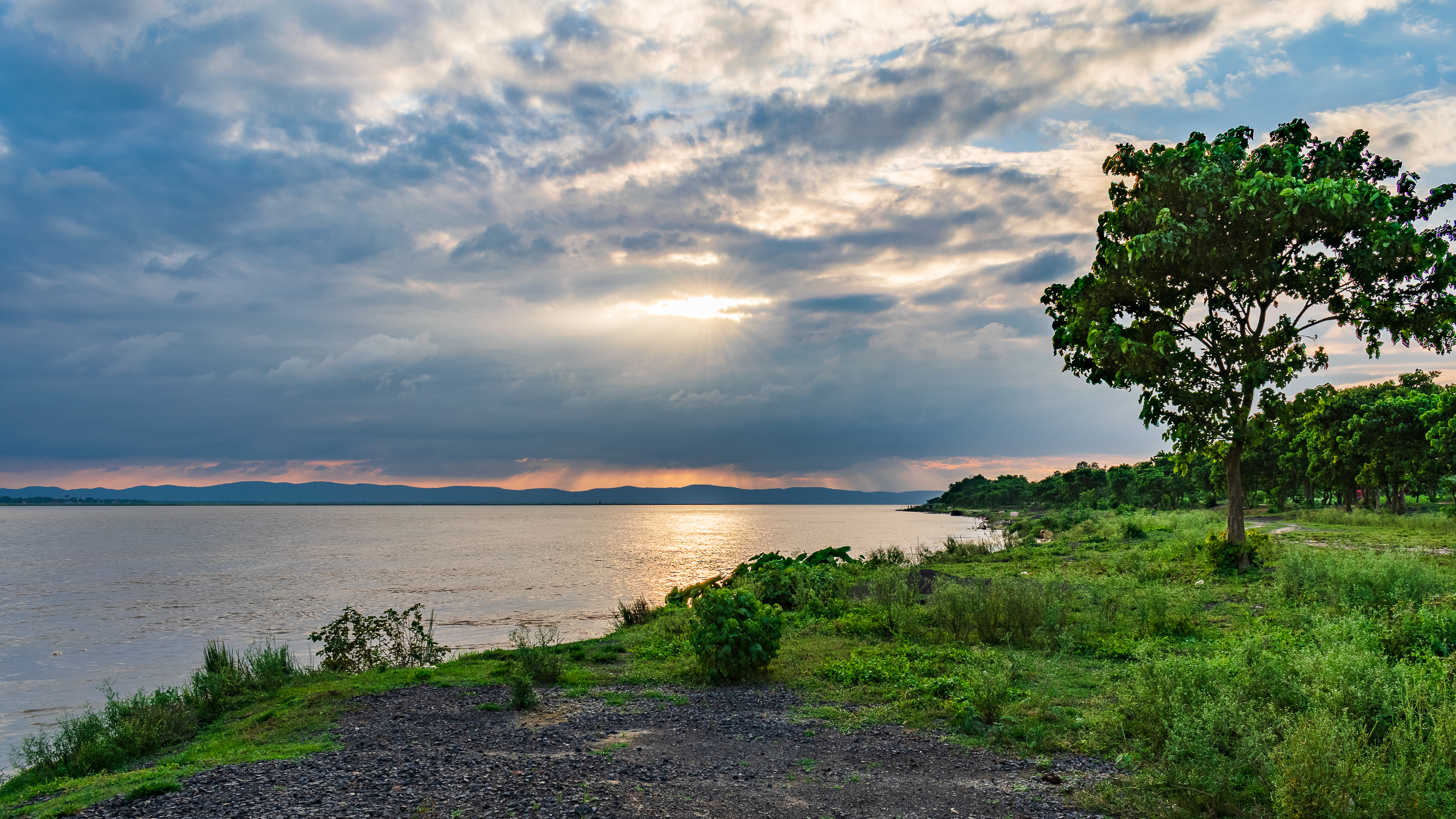
Manikchak Ghat

Manikchak is a community development block that forms an administrative division in Malda Sadar subdivision of Malda district in the Indian state of West Bengal.

== History ==
=== Gauda and Pandua ===
Gauda was once the "capital of the ancient bhukti or political division of Bengal known as Pundravardhana which lay on the eastern extremity of the Gupta Empire." During the rule of the Sena Dynasty, in the 11th-12th century, Gauda was rebuilt and extended as Lakshmanawati (later Lakhnauti), and it became the hub of the Sena empire. Gauda was conquered by Muhammad bin Bakhtiyar Khalji in 1205. During the Turko-Afghan period, "the city of Lakhnauti or Gauda continued to function initially as their capital but was abandoned in 1342 by the Ilyas Shahi sultans in favour of Pandua because of major disturbances along the river course of the Ganga." "Pandua then lay on the banks of the Mahananda, which was the major waterway of the sultanate at the time. However, when the Mahananda too began to veer away from the site of Pandua in the mid-15th century, Gauda was rebuilt and restored to the status of capital city by the Hussain Shahi sultans"... With the ascent of Akbar to the Mughal throne at Delhi... the Mughals annexed the ancient region of Gauda in 1576 and created the Diwani of Bengal. The centre of regional power shifted across the Ganga to Rajmahal, Following the demise of the independent sultanate, the regional importance of the Gauda or Malda region declined irreversibly and the city of Gauda was eventually abandoned.

=== Malda district ===
With the advent of the British, their trading and commercial interests focussed on the new cities of Malda and English Bazar. Malda district was formed in 1813 with "some portion of outlying areas of Purnia, Dinajpur and Rajshahi districts". A separate treasury was established in 1832 and a full-fledged Magistrate and Collector was posted in 1859. Malda district was part of Rajshahi Division till 1876, when it was transferred to Bhagalpur Division, and again transferred in 1905 to Rajshahi Division. With the partition of Bengal in 1947, the Radcliffe Line placed Malda district in India, except the Nawabganj subdivision, which was placed in East Pakistan.

== Geography ==
Manikchak is located at 25°03′45″N 87°54′33″E

Manikchak CD Block is part of the Diara, one of the three physiographic sub-regions of the district. "The Diara is a relatively well drained flat land formed by the fluvial deposition of newer alluvium in the transitional zone between the Barind upland and the marshy Tal tract. The soil is light with sandy appearance and is very fertile. Mango gardens are common and mulberry is also grown in this natural division." It covers 32.16% of the total area of the district. 42.81% of the population of the district live in this sub-region. The Ganges enters the district at Gaduri of Bhutni Char in Manikchak CD Block.

Gopalpur, Dharampur, Manikchak, Dakshin Chandipur, Hiranandapur and Nazirpur gram panchayats in Manikchak CD Block are vulnerable to floods from the adjoining Ganges and Fulahar rivers.

Left bank erosion of the Ganges upstream of Farakka Barrage has rendered nearly 4.5 lakh people homeless in Manikchak, Kaliachak I, II and III and Ratua blocks over the last three decades of the past century. The worst hit area is between Bhutnidiara and Panchanandapore in Kaliachak II block. According to the Ganga Bhangan Pratirodh Action Nagarik Committee, 750 km^{2} area was lost in 30 years in the Manikchak and Kalichak areas.

See also - River bank erosion along the Ganges in Malda and Murshidabad districts

Manikchak is bounded by Amdabad CD Block of Katihar district in Bihar and Ratua I CD Block on the north, Ratua II CD Block and English Bazar CD Block on the east, Kaliachak II CD Block on the south and Sahibganj CD Block and Rajmahal CD Block of Sahibganj district in Jharkhand, across the Ganges, on the west.

Manikchak CD Block has an area of 316.39 km^{2}. It has 1 panchayat samity, 11 gram panchayats, 162 gram sansads (village councils), 89 mouzas and 72 inhabited villages. Manikchak police station serves this block. Headquarters of this CD Block is at Manikchak.

Gram panchayats of Manikchak bloc/ panchayat samiti are: Nurpur, Nazirpur, Hiranandapur, Mathurapur, Gopalpur, Manikchak, Chowki Mirdadpur, Uttar Chandipur, Dakshin Chandipur, Dharampur and Enayetpur.

== Demographics ==
=== Population ===
As per 2011 Census of India, Manikchak CD Block had a total population of 269,813, all of which were rural. There were 139,593 (51%) males and 130,220 (49%) females. Population below 6 years was 43,282. Scheduled Castes numbered 74,816 (27.73%) and Scheduled Tribes numbered 40,125 (14.87%).

Large villages (with 4,000+ population) in Manikchak CD Block were (2011 population in brackets): Uttar Chandipur (10.549), Chandipurmal (6,799), Paschim Chandipur (9,522), Harachandapur (8,191), Naobarar Jagir (6,632), Dakshin Chandipur (5,804), Paschim Narayanpur (5,544), Narayanpur (4,072), Ugritola (7,088), Kamalpur (6,519), Mathurapur (12,755), Talim Nagar (4,023), Chandipur (16,017), Nurpur (14,066), Lalbathani (4,067), Nawada (7,516), Enayetpur (14,729), Purba Saidpur (6,883), Salabatganj (4,744), Chauki Mirdadpur (8,493), Khanpur (7,463), Manikchak (4,038) and Gopalpur (9,867).

Other villages in Manikchak CD Block included (2011 population in brackets): Nazirpur (3,466).

Decadal Population Growth Rate (%)

View source data.

Note: The CD Block data for 1971-1981, 1981-1991 and 1991-2001 is for Manikchak PS

The decadal growth of population in Manikchak CD Block in 2001-2011 was 26.01%. The decadal growth of population in Manikchak PS covering Manikchak CD Block in 1991-2001 was 20.59%. The decadal growth of population in Manikchak PS in 1981-91 was 18.40% and in 1971-81 was 18.36%. The decadal growth rate of population in Malda district was as follows: 30.33% in 1951-61, 31.98% in 1961-71, 26.00% in 1971-81, 29.78% in 1981-91, 24.78% in 1991-2001 and 21.22% in 2001-11. The decadal growth rate for West Bengal in 2001-11 was 13.93%. The decadal growth rate for West Bengal was 13.93 in 2001-2011, 17.77% in 1991-2001. 24.73% in 1981-1991 and 23.17% in 1971-1981.

Malda district has the second highest decadal population growth rate, for the decade 2001-2011, in West Bengal with a figure of 21.2% which is much higher than the state average (13.8%). Uttar Dinajpur district has the highest decadal growth rate in the state with 23.2%. Decadal growth rate of population is higher than that of neighbouring Murshidabad district, which has the next highest growth rate.

Population density in the district has intensified from 162 persons per km^{2} in 1901 to 881 in 2001 (i.e., around five times), which is highest amongst the districts of North Bengal. However, unlike the densely populated southern regions of West Bengal, urbanisation remains low in Malda district. North Bengal in general, and Malda in particular, has been witness to large scale population movement from other states in India, as well as from outside the country. The District Human Development Report for Malda notes, "Malda district has been a principal recipient of the human migration waves of the 20th century."

There are reports of Bangladeshi infiltrators coming through the international border. Only a small portion of the border with Bangladesh has been fenced and it is popularly referred to as a porous border.

=== Literacy ===
As per the 2011 census, the total number of literates in Manikchak CD Block was 130,874 (57.77% of the population over 6 years) out of which males numbered 75,340 (64.18% of the male population over 6 years) and females numbered 55,534 (50.89% of the female population over 6 years). The gender disparity (the difference between female and male literacy rates) was 13.29%.

See also – List of West Bengal districts ranked by literacy rate

Literacy in CD blocks of
Malda district
Malda Sadar subdivision
Gazole – 63.07%
Bamangola – 68.09%
Habibpur – 58.81%
Old Malda – 59.61%
English Bazar – 63.03%
Manikchak – 57.77%
Kaliachak I – 65.25%
Kaliachak II – 64.89%
Kaliachak III – 54.16%
Chanchal subdivision
Harishchandrapur I – 52.47%
Harishchandrapur II – 54.34%
Chanchal I – 65.09%
Chanchal II – 57.38%
Ratua I – 60.13%
Ratua II – 56.19%
Source: 2011 Census: CD Block Wise
Primary Census Abstract Data

=== Language and religion ===
Religion in Manikchak CD block (2011)
Hinduism	55.96%
Islam	43.88%
Other or not stated	0.16%

Hinduism is the majority religion, with 55.96% of the population. Islam is the second-largest religion.

As per 2014 District Statistical Handbook: Malda (quoting census figures), in the 2001 census, Hindus numbered 122,657 and formed 57.28% of the population in Manikchak CD Block. Muslims numbered 91,384 and formed 42.68% of the population. Christians numbered 5. Others numbered 81 and formed 0.04% of the population.

Languages of Manikchak CD block (2011)
1. Bengali (77.6%)
2. Khortha (16.1%)
3. Kisan (3.61%)
4. Bhojpuri (1.38%)
5. Hindi (0.93%)
6. Others (0.37%)

At the time of the 2011 census, 77.63% of the population spoke Bengali, 16.08% Khortha, 3.61% Kisan, 1.38% Bhojpuri and 0.93% Hindi as their first language.

== Rural poverty ==
As per the Human Development Report for Malda district, published in 2006, the percentage of rural families in BPL category in Manikchak CD Block was 33.8%. Official surveys have found households living in absolute poverty in Malda district to be around 39%.

According to the report, "An overwhelmingly large segment of the rural workforce depends on agriculture as its main source of livelihood, the extent of landlessness in Malda has traditionally been high because of the high densities of human settlement in the district… Although land reforms were implemented in Malda district from the time they were launched in other parts of West Bengal, their progress has been uneven across the Malda blocks… because of the overall paucity of land, the extent of ceiling-surplus land available for redistribution has never been large… The high levels of rural poverty that exist in nearly all blocks in Malda district closely reflect the livelihood crisis… "

== Economy ==
=== Livelihood ===
Livelihood
in Manikchak CD Block
1. Cultivators (9.27%)
2. Agricultural labourers (47.2%)
3. Household industries (10.4%)
4. Other Workers (33.1%)

In Manikchak CD Block in 2011, amongst the class of total workers, cultivators numbered 9,053 and formed 9.27%, agricultural labourers numbered 46,068 and formed 47.18%, household industry workers numbered 10,195 and formed 10.44% and other workers numbered 32,330 and formed 33.11%. Total workers numbered 97,646 and formed 36.19% of the total population, and non-workers numbered 172,167 and formed 63.81% of the population.

Note: In the census records a person is considered a cultivator, if the person is engaged in cultivation/ supervision of land owned by self/government/institution. When a person who works on another person's land for wages in cash or kind or share, is regarded as an agricultural labourer. Household industry is defined as an industry conducted by one or more members of the family within the household or village, and one that does not qualify for registration as a factory under the Factories Act. Other workers are persons engaged in some economic activity other than cultivators, agricultural labourers and household workers. It includes factory, mining, plantation, transport and office workers, those engaged in business and commerce, teachers, entertainment artistes and so on.

=== Infrastructure ===
There are 72 inhabited villages in Manikchak CD Block. All 72 villages (100%) have power supply. 70 villages (97.22%) have drinking water supply. 23 villages (31.54%) have post offices. 66 villages (91.67%) have telephones (including landlines, public call offices and mobile phones). 27 villages (37.5%) have a pucca (paved) approach road and 26 villages (36.11%) have transport communication (includes bus service, rail facility and navigable waterways). 10 villages (13.89%) have agricultural credit societies. 10 villages (13.89%) have banks.

=== Agriculture ===
"Large parts of the Diara, now the most intensely settled region within Malda, began to attract a new population from the early 20th century, after the alluvial chars exposed by the Ganga’s westward migration were opened for revenue settlement… Agricultural land in the Tal and Diara is mostly irrigated and intensively cropped and cultivated… Rainfall in the district is moderate…"

Manikchak CD Block had 76 fertiliser depots, 14 seed stores and 51 fair price shops in 2013-14.

In 2013-14, Manikchak CD Block produced 2,750 tonnes of Aman paddy, the main winter crop from 1,143 hectares, 3,949 tonnes of Boro paddy (spring crop) from 1,094 hectares, 392 tonnes of Aus paddy (summer crop) from 202 hectares, 17,669 tonnes of wheat from 7,418 hectares, 3,024 tonnes of maize from 801 hectares, 22,991 tonnes of jute from 1,717 hectares, 3,136 tonnes of potatoes from 97 hectares and 46,575 tonnes of sugar cane from 493 hectares. It also produced pulses and oilseeds.

In 2013-14, the total area irrigated in Manikchak CD Block was 7,284 hectares, out of which 701 hectares were irrigated by river lift irrigation, 482 hectares by deep tube wells, 5,546 hectares by shallow tube wells and 555 hectares by other means.

=== Mango ===
25,500 hectares of land in Malda district produces mango varieties such as langra, himasagar, amrapali, laxmanbhog, gopalbhog and fazli. The core area of mango production is Old Malda, English Bazar and Manikchak CD Blocks, from where it has spread to Kaliachak I & II, Ratua I & II and Chanchal I CD Blocks.

=== Backward Regions Grant Fund ===
Malda district is listed as a backward region and receives financial support from the Backward Regions Grant Fund. The fund, created by the Government of India, is designed to redress regional imbalances in development. As of 2012, 272 districts across the country were listed under this scheme. The list includes 11 districts of West Bengal.

== Transport ==
In 2013-14, Manikchak CD Block had 10 ferry services and 1 originating/ terminating bus route.

State Highway 10 connects Manickchak to National Highway 12 (old number NH 34) at Malda and National Highway 131A at Ratua.

== Education ==
In 2013-14, Manikchak CD Block had 152 primary schools with 29,064 students, 9 middle schools with 1,813 students, 6 high schools with 10,513 students and 16 higher secondary schools with 36,315 students. Manikchak CD Block had 367 institutions for special and non-formal education with 22,586 students.

As per the 2011 census, in Manikchak CD Block, amongst the 72 inhabited villages, 5 villages did not have a school, 37 villages had more than 1 primary school, 30 villages had at least 1 primary and 1 middle school and 21 villages had at least 1 middle and 1 secondary school.

Manikchak College was established at Mathurapur, Manikchak, in 2014.

== Healthcare ==
In 2014, Manikchak CD Block had 1 rural hospital, 3 primary health centres and 1 nursing home with total 53 beds and 9 doctors (excluding private bodies). It had 35 family welfare subcentres. 5,160 patients were treated indoor and 311,405 patients were treated outdoor in the hospitals, health centres and subcentres of the CD Block.

Manikchak Rural Hospital at Manikchak with 30 beds is the main medical facility in Manikchak CD Block. There are primary health centres at Bhutni (with 10 beds), Mathurapur (with 4 beds) and Nurpur (with 4 beds).
