= 2026 Malda violence =

- 2026 Malda violence (West Bengal) 2026 Malda violence (India)
- Location: 24°56′05″N 88°02′33″E; Mothabari, Malda district, West Bengal, India
- Date: April 1, 2026; 15:30 (IST (UTC+05:30))
- Attack type: political violence
- Motive: Anger over not founding names in the voter list after SIR

The 2026 Malda violence, which is also known as publicly as Mothabari violence is a violence which took place in Mothabari of Malda district, West Bengal, India ahead of 2026 polls by some people.

The main reason of violence was the protest related to allegedly not including names of the voters of the Mothabari after SIR of West Bengal.

== Background ==
During the SIR process in West Bengal, just months before the 2026 West Bengal polls, several names were got deleted due to unable to link with old 2002 voter list of SIR. Already as of April 2026, as per ECI's official data, approx. 91 lakh voters name were deleted from the list, through the process of logical discrepancy.

Following protests by the deleted voters, Supreme Court of India directed Election Commission of India to appoint judicial officers who will establish 19 tribunals, where the names of deleted voters would can be appealed.

The process was ongoing in the state however but on April 1, in Mothabari, the seven judicial officers (out of which three were women), which were gheraoed (hostage) near BDO office.

A large number of police and security forces went to rescue the judicial officers late that night.

== Reactions ==
Soon after the violence both in Kaliaganj and Mothabari of Malda district, Supreme Court reacted to this by terming this incident as a "brazen attempt" to challenge the authority of the judiciary and also warned the state government for such mismanagement. SC handovered the investigation of this case to NIA.

During the investigation, on April 4, NIA team visited SP and BDO offices in Malda. The prime accused in the violence incident, Moffakkerul Islam who is a lawyer and also AIMIM candidate from Mothabari was arrested by the NIA, along with 34 others. Soon during the investigation, NIA also arrested the Congress candidate Sayem Choudhury and Panchayat member Golam Rabbani.

Soon after the incident, Chief Minister of West Bengal and Trinamool Congress supremo Mamata Banerjee alleged that NIA is harassing the people on the orders of Home Minister Amit Shah in order for Bharatiya Janata Party to win over Bengal in the polls.

BJP gave a statement, blaming Mamata Govt. for such mismanagement. BJP West Bengal team led by President Samik Bhattacharya and Minister Sukanta Majumdar was not allowed to visit the violence place by the police.

During the rally in Malda, Prime Minister Narendra Modi also criticized the mismanagement of TMC government, terming it as 'Maha Jungle-Raj'. Meanwhile, West Bengal Education minister and TMC leader Bratya Basu alleged that PM Modi is trying to defame and to spread hatred towards Bengali language.

== Aftermath ==
Despite the chaos and violence, entire Malda district and Mothabari went to polls on 23 April, scheduled on for the first phase of the 2026 West Bengal polls, followed by the second phase on 29 April. On 4 May, the result was counted where BJP came to power, removing TMC government led by Mamata Banerjee.
