= Kaliachak II =

- Community development block
- Interactive map of Kaliachak II
- Coordinates: 24°57′49″N 88°05′22″E
- Country: India
- State: West Bengal
- District: Malda

Government
  - Type: Representative democracy

Area
  - Total: 209.17 km^{2} (80.76 sq mi)

Population (2011)
  - Total: 210,105
  - Density: 1,004.5/km^{2} (2,601.6/sq mi)

Languages
  - Official: Bengali, English
- Time zone: UTC+5:30 (IST)
- PIN: 732207
- STD/ telephone code: 03512
- Lok Sabha constituency: Maldaha Dakshin
- Vidhan Sabha constituency: Mothabari
- Website: malda.nic.in - District administration
- kaliachak2.com - Block Development Office

Kaliachak II is a community development block that forms an administrative division in Malda Sadar subdivision of Malda district in the Indian state of West Bengal.

== History ==
=== Gauda and Pandua ===
Gauda was once the "capital of the ancient bhukti or political division of Bengal known as Pundravardhana which lay on the eastern extremity of the Gupta Empire." During the rule of the Sena Dynasty, in the 11th-12th century, Gauda was rebuilt and extended as Lakshmanawati (later Lakhnauti), and it became the hub of the Sena empire. Gauda was conquered by Muhammad bin Bakhtiyar Khalji in 1205. During the Turko-Afghan period, "the city of Lakhnauti or Gauda continued to function initially as their capital but was abandoned in 1342 by the Ilyas Shahi sultans in favour of Pandua because of major disturbances along the river course of the Ganga." "Pandua then lay on the banks of the Mahananda, which was the major waterway of the sultanate at the time. However, when the Mahananda too began to veer away from the site of Pandua in the mid-15th century, Gauda was rebuilt and restored to the status of capital city by the Hussain Shahi sultans"... With the ascent of Akbar to the Mughal throne at Delhi... the Mughals annexed the ancient region of Gauda in 1576 and created the Diwani of Bengal. The centre of regional power shifted across the Ganga to Rajmahal. Following the demise of the independent sultanate, the regional importance of the Gauda or Malda region declined irreversibly and the city of Gauda was eventually abandoned.

=== Malda district ===
With the advent of the British, their trading and commercial interests focussed on the new cities of Malda and English Bazar. Malda district was formed in 1813 with "some portion of outlying areas of Purnia, Dinajpur and Rajshahi districts". A separate treasury was established in 1832 and a full-fledged Magistrate and Collector was posted in 1859. Malda district was part of Rajshahi Division till 1876, when it was transferred to Bhagalpur Division, and again transferred in 1905 to Rajshahi Division. With the partition of Bengal in 1947, the Radcliffe Line placed Malda district in India, except the Nawabganj subdivision, which was placed in East Pakistan.

== Geography ==
Kaliachak II community development block is located at 24°57′49″N 88°05′22″E

Kaliachak II CD Block is part of the Diara, one of the three physiographic sub-regions of the district. "The Diara is a relatively well drained flat land formed by the fluvial deposition of newer alluvium in the transitional zone between the Barind upland and the marshy Tal tract. The soil is light with sandy appearance and is very fertile. Mango gardens are common and mulberry is also grown in this natural division." It covers 32.16% of the total area of the district. 42.81% of the population of the district live in this sub-region.

Bangitola, Uttar Panchanandapur I, Uttar Panchanandapur II, Hamidpur and Rajnagar gram panchayats in Kaliachak II CD Block are vulnerable to floods from the adjoining Ganges.

Left bank erosion of the Ganges upstream of Farakka Barrage has rendered nearly 4.5 lakh people homeless in Manikchak, Kaliachak I, II and III and Ratua blocks over the last three decades of the past century. The worst hit area is between Bhutnidiara and Panchanandapore in Kaliachak II block. According to the Ganga Bhangan Pratirodh Action Nagarik Committee, 750 km^{2} area was lost in 30 years in the Manikchak and Kalichak areas.

See also - River bank erosion along the Ganges in Malda and Murshidabad districts

Kaliachak II CD Block is bounded by Manikchak CD Block and English Bazar CD Block on the north, Kaliachak I CD Block on the east, Kaliachak III CD Block on the south and Rajmahal CD Block of Sahibganj district in Jharkhand, across the Ganges, on the west.

Kaliachak II CD Block has an area of 209.17 km^{2}. It has 1 panchayat samity, 9 gram panchayats, 127 gram sansads (village councils), 65 mouzas and 40 inhabited villages. Kaliachak police station serves this block. Headquarters of this CD Block is at Mothabari.

Gram panchayats of Kaliachak II block/ panchayat samiti are: Uttar Laxmipur, Mothabari, Hamidpur, Rajnagar, Uttar Panchanandapur-I, Uttar Panchanandapur-II, Bangitola, Rathbari and Gangaprasad.

== Demographics ==
=== Population ===
As per 2011 Census of India, Kaliachak II CD Block had a total population of 210,105, of which 206,267 were rural and 3,838 were urban. There were 107,553 (51%) males and 102,552 (49%) females. Population below 6 years was 34,376. Scheduled Castes numbered 32,686 (15.56%) and Scheduled Tribes numbered 4,816 (2.29%).

Census town in Kaliachak II CD Block was (2011 population in brackets): Birodhi (3,838).

Large villages (with 4,000+ population) in Kaliachak II CD Block were (2011 population in brackets): Jotkasuri (4,901), Panchanandapur (26,358), Hamidpur (7,954), Nayagram (8,109), Shripur (4,871), Uttar Lakshmipur (17,085), Bishnuprosad (5,503), Mabarakpur (7,680), Jot Ananta (11,473), Sadipur (7,048), Jot Gopalkagmari (14,307), Mehrapur (4,713), Gangaprosad (7,037), Tap Protappur (7,558), Mathabari (9,884), Purba Hosenabad (7,660), Chhota Mahadipur (4,059) and Dakshin Debipur (6,334).

Decadal Population Growth Rate (%) Note: The CD Block data for 1971–1981, 1981–1991 and 1991–2001 is for Kaliachak I, II & III taken together. View chart definition.

The decadal growth of population in Kaliachak II CD Block in 2001-2011 was -0.62%. The decadal growth of population in Kaliachak PS or Kaliachak I, II & III CD Blocks taken together in 1991-2001 was 29.62%. The decadal growth of population in Kaliachak PS or Kaliachak I, II & III CD Blocks taken together in 1981-91 was 33.16% and in 1971-81 was 0.42%. The decadal growth rate of population in Malda district was as follows: 30.33% in 1951–61, 31.98% in 1961–71, 26.00% in 1971–81, 29.78% in 1981–91, 24.78% in 1991-2001 and 21.22% in 2001–11. The decadal growth rate for West Bengal in 2001-11 was 13.93%. The decadal growth rate for West Bengal was 13.93 in 2001–2011, 17.77% in 1991–2001. 24.73% in 1981-1991 and 23.17% in 1971–1981.

Malda district has the second highest decadal population growth rate, for the decade 2001–2011, in West Bengal with a figure of 21.2% which is much higher than the state average (13.8%). Uttar Dinajpur district has the highest decadal growth rate in the state with 23.2%. Decadal growth rate of population is higher than that of neighbouring Murshidabad district, which has the next highest growth rate.

Population density in the district has intensified from 162 persons per km^{2} in 1901 to 881 in 2001 (i.e., around five times), which is highest amongst the districts of North Bengal. However, unlike the densely populated southern regions of West Bengal, urbanisation remains low in Malda district. North Bengal in general, and Malda in particular, has been witness to large scale population movement from other states in India and other districts of West Bengal, as well as from outside the country. The District Human Development Report for Malda notes, "Malda district has been a principal recipient of the human migration waves of the 20th century."

There are reports of Bangladeshi infiltrators coming through the international border. Only a small portion of the border with Bangladesh has been fenced and it is popularly referred to as a porous border.

=== Literacy ===
As per the 2011 census, the total number of literates in Kaliachak II CD Block was 114,031 (64.89% of the population over 6 years) out of which males numbered 62,701 (69.60% of the male population over 6 years) and females numbered 51,330 (59.93% of the female population over 6 years). The gender disparity (the difference between female and male literacy rates) was 9.67%.

See also – List of West Bengal districts ranked by literacy rate

Literacy in CD blocks of
Malda district
Malda Sadar subdivision
Gazole – 63.07%
Bamangola – 68.09%
Habibpur – 58.81%
Old Malda – 59.61%
English Bazar – 63.03%
Manikchak – 57.77%
Kaliachak I – 65.25%
Kaliachak II – 64.89%
Kaliachak III – 54.16%
Chanchal subdivision
Harishchandrapur I – 52.47%
Harishchandrapur II – 54.34%
Chanchal I – 65.09%
Chanchal II – 57.38%
Ratua I – 60.13%
Ratua II – 56.19%
Source: 2011 Census: CD Block Wise
Primary Census Abstract Data

=== Language and religion ===
Religion in Kaliachak II CD block (2011)
Islam	65.98%
Hinduism	33.88%
Other or not stated	0.14%

Islam is the majority religion, with 65.98% of the population. Hinduism is the second-largest religion.

As per 2014 District Statistical Handbook: Malda (quoting census figures), in the 2001 census, Muslims numbered 142,722 and formed 67.53% of the population in Kaliachak II CD Block. Hindus numbered 68,548 and formed 32.42% of the population. Christians numbered 4. Others numbered 82 and formed 0.05% of the population.

Bengali is the predominant language, spoken by 99.40% of the population.

== Rural poverty ==
As per the Human Development Report for Malda district, published in 2006, the percentage of rural families in BPL category in Kaliachak II CD Block was 35.0%. Official surveys have found households living in absolute poverty in Malda district to be around 39%.

According to the report, "An overwhelmingly large segment of the rural workforce depends on agriculture as its main source of livelihood, the extent of landlessness in Malda has traditionally been high because of the high densities of human settlement in the district… Although land reforms were implemented in Malda district from the time they were launched in other parts of West Bengal, their progress has been uneven across the Malda blocks… because of the overall paucity of land, the extent of ceiling-surplus land available for redistribution has never been large… The high levels of rural poverty that exist in nearly all blocks in Malda district closely reflect the livelihood crisis… "

== Economy ==
=== Livelihood ===
Livelihood
in Kaliachak II CD Block
1. Cultivators (7.99%)
2. Agricultural labourers (26.2%)
3. Household industries (30.5%)
4. Other Workers (35.3%)

In Kaliachak II CD Block in 2011, amongst the class of total workers, cultivators numbered 7,165 and formed 7.99%, agricultural labourers numbered 23,537 and formed 26.25%, household industry workers numbered 27,320 and formed 30.47% and other workers numbered 31,637 and formed 35.29%. Total workers numbered 89,659 and formed 42.67% of the total population, and non-workers numbered 120,446 and formed 57.33% of the population.

Note: In the census records a person is considered a cultivator, if the person is engaged in cultivation/ supervision of land owned by self/government/institution. When a person who works on another person's land for wages in cash or kind or share, is regarded as an agricultural labourer. Household industry is defined as an industry conducted by one or more members of the family within the household or village, and one that does not qualify for registration as a factory under the Factories Act. Other workers are persons engaged in some economic activity other than cultivators, agricultural labourers and household workers. It includes factory, mining, plantation, transport and office workers, those engaged in business and commerce, teachers, entertainment artistes and so on.

=== Infrastructure ===
There are 40 inhabited villages in Kaliachak II CD Block. All 40 villages (100%) have power supply. All 40 villages (100%) have drinking water supply. 16 villages (40%) have post offices. All 40 villages (100%) have telephones (including landlines, public call offices and mobile phones). Only 1 village (2.5%) has a pucca (paved) approach road and 14 villages (35%) have transport communication (includes bus service, rail facility and navigable waterways). 5 villages (12.5%) have agricultural credit societies. 7 villages (17.5%) have banks.

=== Agriculture ===
"Large parts of the Diara, now the most intensely settled region within Malda, began to attract a new population from the early 20th century, after the alluvial chars exposed by the Ganga’s westward migration were opened for revenue settlement… Agricultural land in the Tal and Diara is mostly irrigated and intensively cropped and cultivated… Rainfall in the district is moderate…"

Kaliachak II CD Block had 69 fertiliser depots, 7 seed stores and 51 fair price shops in 2013–14.

In 2013–14, Kaliachak II CD Block produced 848 tonnes of Aman paddy, the main winter crop from 385 hectares, 3,629 tonnes of Boro paddy (spring crop) from 922 hectares, 375 tonnes of Aus paddy (summer crop) from 193 hectares, 4,069 tonnes of wheat from 1,363 hectares, 1,846 tonnes of maize from 407 hectares, 7,077 tonnes of jute from 497 hectares, 3,764 tonnes of potatoes from 111 hectares and 107,024 tonnes of sugar cane from 1,007 hectares. It also produced pulses and oilseeds.

In 2013–14, the total area irrigated in Kaliachak II CD Block was 2,756 hectares, out of which 385 hectares were irrigated by river lift irrigation, 440 hectares by deep tube wells, 1,728 hectares by shallow tube wells and 203 hectares by other means.

=== Mango ===
25,500 hectares of land in Malda district produces mango varieties such as langra, himasagar, amrapali, laxmanbhog, gopalbhog and fazli. The core area of mango production is Old Malda, English Bazar and Manikchak CD Blocks, from where it has spread to Kaliachak I & II, Ratua I & II and Chanchal I CD Blocks.

=== Backward Regions Grant Fund ===
Malda district is listed as a backward region and receives financial support from the Backward Regions Grant Fund. The fund, created by the Government of India, is designed to redress regional imbalances in development. As of 2012, 272 districts across the country were listed under this scheme. The list includes 11 districts of West Bengal.

== Transport ==
In 2013–14, Kaliachak II CD Block had 6 originating/ terminating bus routes.

== Education ==
In 2013–14, Kaliachak II CD Block had 130 primary schools with 19,278 students, 8 middle schools with 4,489 students, 8 high schools with 14,598 students and 9 higher secondary schools with 16,981 students. Kaliachak II CD Block had 2 technical/ professional institutions with 260 students and 332 institutions for special and non-formal education with 15,803 students.

As per the 2011 census, in Kaliachak II CD Block, amongst the 40 inhabited villages, 1 village did not have a school, 17 villages had more than 1 primary school, 22 villages had at least 1 primary and 1 middle school and 14 villages had at least 1 middle and 1 secondary school.

== Healthcare ==
In 2014, Kaliachak II CD Block had 1 rural hospital and 2 primary health centres with total 40 beds and 9 doctors (excluding private bodies). It had 34 family welfare subcentres. 9,075 patients were treated indoor and 178,600 patients were treated outdoor in the hospitals, health centres and subcentres of the CD Block.

Bangitola Rural Hospital at Bangitola (with 30 beds) is the main medical facility in Kaliachak II CD Block. There are primary health centres at Rajnagar (Hamidpur PHC) (with 4 beds) and Mothabari (with 10 beds).

== See also ==
- Kaliachak (Vidhan Sabha constituency)
