= Kaliachak III =

- Community development block
- Interactive map of Kaliachak III
- Coordinates: 24.8402°N 87.9776°E
- Country: India 87.9776
- State: West Bengal
- District: Malda

Government
  - Type: Representative democracy

Area
  - Total: 127.37 km^{2} (49.18 sq mi)

Population (2011)
  - Total: 359,071
  - Density: 2,819.1/km^{2} (7,301.5/sq mi)

Languages
  - Official: Bengali, English
- Time zone: UTC+5:30 (IST)
- PIN: 732210
- STD/ telephone code: 03512
- Lok Sabha constituency: Maldaha Dakshin
- Vidhan Sabha constituency: Baisnabnagar
- Website: malda.nic.in - District administration
- bdokaliachak3.com - Block development office

Kaliachak III is a community development block that forms an administrative division in Malda Sadar subdivision of Malda district in the Indian state of West Bengal.

== History ==
=== Gauda and Pandua ===
Gauda was once the “capital of the ancient bhukti or political division of Bengal known as Pundravardhana which lay on the eastern extremity of the Gupta Empire.” During the rule of the Sena Dynasty, in the 11th-12th century, Gauda was rebuilt and extended as Lakshmanawati (later Lakhnauti), and it became the hub of the Sena empire. Gauda was conquered by Muhammad bin Bakhtiyar Khalji in 1205. During the Turko-Afghan period, “the city of Lakhnauti or Gauda continued to function initially as their capital but was abandoned in 1342 by the Ilyas Shahi sultans in favour of Pandua because of major disturbances along the river course of the Ganga.” “Pandua then lay on the banks of the Mahananda, which was the major waterway of the sultanate at the time. However, when the Mahananda too began to veer away from the site of Pandua in the mid-15th century, Gauda was rebuilt and restored to the status of capital city by the Hussain Shahi sultans”… With the ascent of Akbar to the Mughal throne at Delhi… the Mughals annexed the ancient region of Gauda in 1576 and created the Diwani of Bengal. The centre of regional power shifted across the Ganga to Rajmahal. Following the demise of the independent sultanate, the regional importance of the Gauda or Malda region declined irreversibly and the city of Gauda was eventually abandoned.

=== Malda district ===
With the advent of the British, their trading and commercial interests focussed on the new cities of Malda and English Bazar. Malda district was formed in 1813 with “some portion of outlying areas of Purnia, Dinajpur and Rajshahi districts”. A separate treasury was established in 1832 and a full-fledged Magistrate and Collector was posted in 1859. Malda district was part of Rajshahi Division till 1876, when it was transferred to Bhagalpur Division, and again transferred in 1905 to Rajshahi Division. With the partition of Bengal in 1947, the Radcliffe Line placed Malda district in India, except the Nawabganj subdivision, which was placed in East Pakistan.

== Geography ==
Kaliachak III community development block is located at 24°45′47″N 88°06′32″E

Kaliachak III CD Block is part of the Diara, one of the three physiographic sub-regions of the district. “The Diara is a relatively well drained flat land formed by the fluvial deposition of newer alluvium in the transitional zone between the Barind upland and the marshy Tal tract. The soil is light with sandy appearance and is very fertile. Mango gardens are common and mulberry is also grown in this natural division.” It covers 32.16% of the total area of the district. 42.81% of the population of the district live in this sub-region.

Birnagar I, Birnagar II, Lakshmipur, Kumbhira, Bakhrabad and Pardeonapur-Sovapur gram panchayats of Kaliachak III CD Block are vulnerable to floods from the adjoining Ganges.

Left bank erosion of the Ganges upstream of Farakka Barrage has rendered nearly 4.5 lakh people homeless in Manikchak, Kaliachak I, II and III and Ratua blocks over the last three decades of the past century. The worst hit area is between Bhutnidiara and Panchanandapore in Kaliachak II block. According to the Ganga Bhangan Pratirodh Action Nagarik Committee, 750 km^{2} area was lost in 30 years in the Manikchak and Kalichak areas.

See also - River bank erosion along the Ganges in Malda and Murshidabad districts

Construction of the Farakka Barrage, located in the Murshidabad and Malda districts, commenced in 1961 and it was commissioned in 1975.

Kaliachak III CD Block is bounded by Kaliachak II CD Block, Kaliachak I CD Block and English Bazar CD Block on the north, Shibganj Upazila in Chapai Nawabganj District, Bangladesh, on the east and south, and Farakka CD Block, in Murshidabad district, across the Ganges, on the west.

Kaliachak III CD Block has an area of 127.37 km^{2}. It has 1 panchayat samity, 14 gram panchayats, 204 gram sansads (village councils), 75 mouzas and 65 inhabited villages. Baisnabnagar police station serves this block. Headquarters of this CD Block is at Dariapur.

165.5 km of the India-Bangladesh border is in Malda district. CD Blocks on the border are Bamangola, Habibpur, Old Malda, English Bazar and Kaliachak-III.

Gram panchayats of Kaliachak III block/ panchayat samiti are: Akandabaria, Sahabajpur, Charianantapur, Golapganj, Bhagabanpur, Krishnapur, Bedrabad, Sahabanchak, Birnagar-I, Birnagar-II, Laxmipur, Kumbhira, Bakhrabad and Pardeonapur.

== Demographics ==
=== Population ===
As per 2011 Census of India, Kaliachak III CD Block had a total population of 359,071, of which 329,147 were rural and 29,924 were urban. There were 184,213 (51%) males and 174,858 (49%) females. Population below 6 years was 64,163. Scheduled Castes numbered 105,698 (29.44%) and Scheduled Tribes numbered 25,310 (7.05%).

Census towns in Kaliachak III CD Block were (2011 population in brackets): Jagannathpur (13,454) and Krishnapur (16,470).

Large villages (with 4,000+ population) in Kaliachak III CD Block were (2011 population in brackets): Sultanganj (28,723), Mahabbatpur (4,149), Chari Anantapur (21,883), Shahbazpur (13,975), Gopalganj (15,371), Baishnabnagar (15,695), Lakshmipur (15,569), Chak Seherdi (7,850), Dariapur (6,249), Chak Bahadurpur (6,628), Suzapur Mandal (8,807), Chainpara (7,570), Jayenpur (7,538), Kumbhira (4,954), Deonapur (12,381), Sabdulpur (8,970), Nandalalapur (6,441), Bhagabanpur (17,397), Kalinagar (4,567), Bedrabad (15,123), Gopalpur (4,794) and Par Deonapur (16,856).

Decadal Population Growth Rate (%) Note: The CD Block data for 1971–1981, 1981–1991 and 1991–2001 is for Kaliachak I, II & III taken together. View chart definition.

The decadal growth of population in Kaliachak III CD Block in 2001-2011 was 15.74%. The decadal growth of population in Kaliachak PS or Kaliachak I, II & III CD Blocks taken together in 1991-2001 was 29.62%. The decadal growth of population in Kaliachak PS or Kaliachak I, II & III CD Blocks taken together in 1981-91 was 33.16% and in 1971-81 was 0.42%. The decadal growth rate of population in Malda district was as follows: 30.33% in 1951–61, 31.98% in 1961–71, 26.00% in 1971–81, 29.78% in 1981–91, 24.78% in 1991-2001 and 21.22% in 2001-11. The decadal growth rate for West Bengal in 2001-11 was 13.93%. The decadal growth rate for West Bengal was 13.93 in 2001–2011, 17.77% in 1991-2001. 24.73% in 1981-1991 and 23.17% in 1971-1981.

Malda district has the second highest decadal population growth rate, for the decade 2001–2011, in West Bengal with a figure of 21.2% which is much higher than the state average (13.8%). Uttar Dinajpur district has the highest decadal growth rate in the state with 23.2%. Decadal growth rate of population is higher than that of neighbouring Murshidabad district, which has the next highest growth rate.

Population density in the district has intensified from 162 persons per km^{2} in 1901 to 881 in 2001 (i.e., around five times), which is highest amongst the districts of North Bengal. However, unlike the densely populated southern regions of West Bengal, urbanisation remains low in Malda district. North Bengal in general, and Malda in particular, has been witness to large scale population movement from other states in India and other districts of West Bengal, as well as from outside the country. The District Human Development Report for Malda notes, “Malda district has been a principal recipient of the human migration waves of the 20th century.”

The decadal growth rate of population in neighbouring Chapai Nawabganj District, in Bangladesh was 15.59% for the decade 2001–2011, down from 21.67% in the decade 1991-2001.

There are reports of Bangladeshi infiltrators coming through the international border. Only a small portion of the border with Bangladesh has been fenced and it is popularly referred to as a porous border.

=== Literacy ===
As per the 2011 census, the total number of literates in Kaliachak III CD Block was 159,712 (54.16% of the population over 6 years) out of which males numbered 90,816 (59.75% of the male population over 6 years) and females numbered 68,896 (48.07% of the female population over 6 years). The gender disparity (the difference between female and male literacy rates) was 11.68%.

See also – List of West Bengal districts ranked by literacy rate

Literacy in CD blocks of
Malda district
Malda Sadar subdivision
Gazole – 63.07%
Bamangola – 68.09%
Habibpur – 58.81%
Old Malda – 59.61%
English Bazar – 63.03%
Manikchak – 57.77%
Kaliachak I – 65.25%
Kaliachak II – 64.89%
Kaliachak III – 54.16%
Chanchal subdivision
Harishchandrapur I – 52.47%
Harishchandrapur II – 54.34%
Chanchal I – 65.09%
Chanchal II – 57.38%
Ratua I – 60.13%
Ratua II – 56.19%
Source: 2011 Census: CD Block Wise
Primary Census Abstract Data

=== Language and religion ===
Religion in Kaliachak III CD block (2011)
Hinduism	51.01%
Islam	48.72%
Other or not stated	0.27%

Hinduism is the majority religion, with 51.01% of the population. Islam is the second-largest religion.

As per 2014 District Statistical Handbook: Malda (quoting census figures), in the 2001 census, Hindus numbered 148,358 and formed 52.17% of the population in Kaliachak III CD Block. Muslims numbered 135,654 and formed 47.70% of the population. Christians numbered 165 and formed 0.06% of the population. Others numbered 199 and formed 0.07% of the population.

Languages of Kaliachak III CD block (2011)
1. Bengali (97.5%)
2. Khotta (1.64%)
3. Others (0.87%)

At the time of the 2011 census, 97.49% of the population spoke Bengali and 1.64% Khotta as their first language.

== Rural poverty ==
As per the Human Development Report for Malda district, published in 2006, the percentage of rural families in BPL category in Kaliachak III CD Block was 36.0%. Official surveys have found households living in absolute poverty in Malda district to be around 39%.

According to the report, “An overwhelmingly large segment of the rural workforce depends on agriculture as its main source of livelihood, the extent of landlessness in Malda has traditionally been high because of the high densities of human settlement in the district… Although land reforms were implemented in Malda district from the time they were launched in other parts of West Bengal, their progress has been uneven across the Malda blocks… because of the overall paucity of land, the extent of ceiling-surplus land available for redistribution has never been large… The high levels of rural poverty that exist in nearly all blocks in Malda district closely reflect the livelihood crisis… “

== Economy ==
=== Livelihood ===
Livelihood
in Kaliachak III CD Block
1. Cultivators (11.9%)
2. Agricultural labourers (25.3%)
3. Household industries (37.8%)
4. Other Workers (25.0%)

In Kaliachak III CD Block in 2011, amongst the class of total workers, cultivators numbered 19,127 and formed 11.92%, agricultural labourers numbered 40,520 and formed 25.26%, household industry workers numbered 60,603 and formed 37.78% and other workers numbered 40,145 and formed 25.03%. Total workers numbered 160,395 and formed 44.67% of the total population, and non-workers numbered 198,676 and formed 55.33% of the population.

Note: In the census records a person is considered a cultivator, if the person is engaged in cultivation/ supervision of land owned by self/government/institution. When a person who works on another person’s land for wages in cash or kind or share, is regarded as an agricultural labourer. Household industry is defined as an industry conducted by one or more members of the family within the household or village, and one that does not qualify for registration as a factory under the Factories Act. Other workers are persons engaged in some economic activity other than cultivators, agricultural labourers and household workers. It includes factory, mining, plantation, transport and office workers, those engaged in business and commerce, teachers, entertainment artistes and so on.

=== Infrastructure ===
There are 65 inhabited villages in Kaliachak III CD Block. All 65 villages (100%) have power supply. 64 villages (98.46%) have drinking water supply. 26 villages (40%) have post offices. 50 villages (76.92%) have telephones (including landlines, public call offices and mobile phones). 31 village (47.69%) have a pucca (paved) approach road and 10 villages (15.38%) have transport communication (includes bus service, rail facility and navigable waterways). 4 villages (6.15%) have agricultural credit societies. 5 villages (7.69%) have banks.

=== Agriculture ===
“Large parts of the Diara, now the most intensely settled region within Malda, began to attract a new population from the early 20th century, after the alluvial chars exposed by the Ganga’s westward migration were opened for revenue settlement… Agricultural land in the Tal and Diara is mostly irrigated and intensively cropped and cultivated… Rainfall in the district is moderate…”

Kaliachak III CD Block had 87 fertiliser depots, 6 seed stores and 64 fair price shops in 2013-14.

In 2013–14, Kaliachak III CD Block produced 7,372 tonnes of Aman paddy, the main winter crop from 2,436 hectares, 7,288 tonnes of Boro paddy (spring crop) from 1,838 hectares, 2,335 tonnes of Aus paddy (summer crop) from 1,202 hectares, 20,285 tonnes of wheat from 7,745 hectares, 636 tonnes of maize from 157 hectares, 29,959 tonnes of jute from 2,045 hectares, 17,846 tonnes of potatoes from 514 hectares and 18,323 tonnes of sugar cane from 179 hectares. It also produced pulses and oilseeds.

In 2013–14, the total area irrigated in Kaliachak III CD Block was 6,189 hectares, out of which 92 hectares were irrigated by river lift irrigation, 416 hectares by deep tube wells, 5,469 hectares by shallow tube wells and 212 hectares by other means.

=== Backward Regions Grant Fund ===
Malda district is listed as a backward region and receives financial support from the Backward Regions Grant Fund. The fund, created by the Government of India, is designed to redress regional imbalances in development. As of 2012, 272 districts across the country were listed under this scheme. The list includes 11 districts of West Bengal.

== Transport ==
In 2013–14, Kaliachak III CD Block had 2 ferry services and 4 originating/ terminating bus routes.

The stations between New Farakka and Malda Town on the Howrah-New Jalpaiguri line are: Chamagram, Khaltipur, Jamirghata and Gour Malda.

NH 12 (old number NH 34) passes through Kaliachak III CD Block.

== Education ==
In 2013–14, Kaliachak III CD Block had 121 primary schools with 24,494 students, 16 middle schools with 6,414 students, 6 high schools with 10,054 students and 16 higher secondary schools with 35,469 students. Kaliachak III CD Block had 1 general degree college with 4,464 students and 484 institutions for special and non-formal education with 29,213 students.

As per the 2011 census, in Kaliachak III CD Block, amongst the 65 inhabited villages, 7 villages did not have a school, 27 villages had more than 1 primary school, 31 villages had at least 1 primary and 1 middle school and 20 villages had at least 1 middle and 1 secondary school.

South Malda College was established at Pubarun, Laksmipur, Kaliachak III, in 1995.

== Healthcare ==
In 2014, Kaliachak III CD Block had 1 rural hospital, 2 primary health centres and 3 central government/ PSU medical centres with total 80 beds and 6 doctors (excluding private bodies). It had 41 family welfare subcentres. 7,986 patients were treated indoor and 142,697 patients were treated outdoor in the hospitals, health centres and subcentres of the CD Block.

Bedrabad Rural Hospital at Bedrabad, PO Baisnabnagar (with 30 beds) is the main medical facility in Kaliachak III CD Block. There are primary health centres at Sabdalpur (Kumbhira PHC) (with 10 beds) and Gopalganj (with 10 beds).

== See also ==
- Kaliachak (Vidhan Sabha constituency)
