= Sonatala =

Sonatala may refer to:

- Sonatala Upazila, an upazila in Bogura District, Rajshahi Division, Bangladesh
- Sonatala, Malda, a census town in West Bengal, India
