= English Bazar (community development block) =

- Community development block
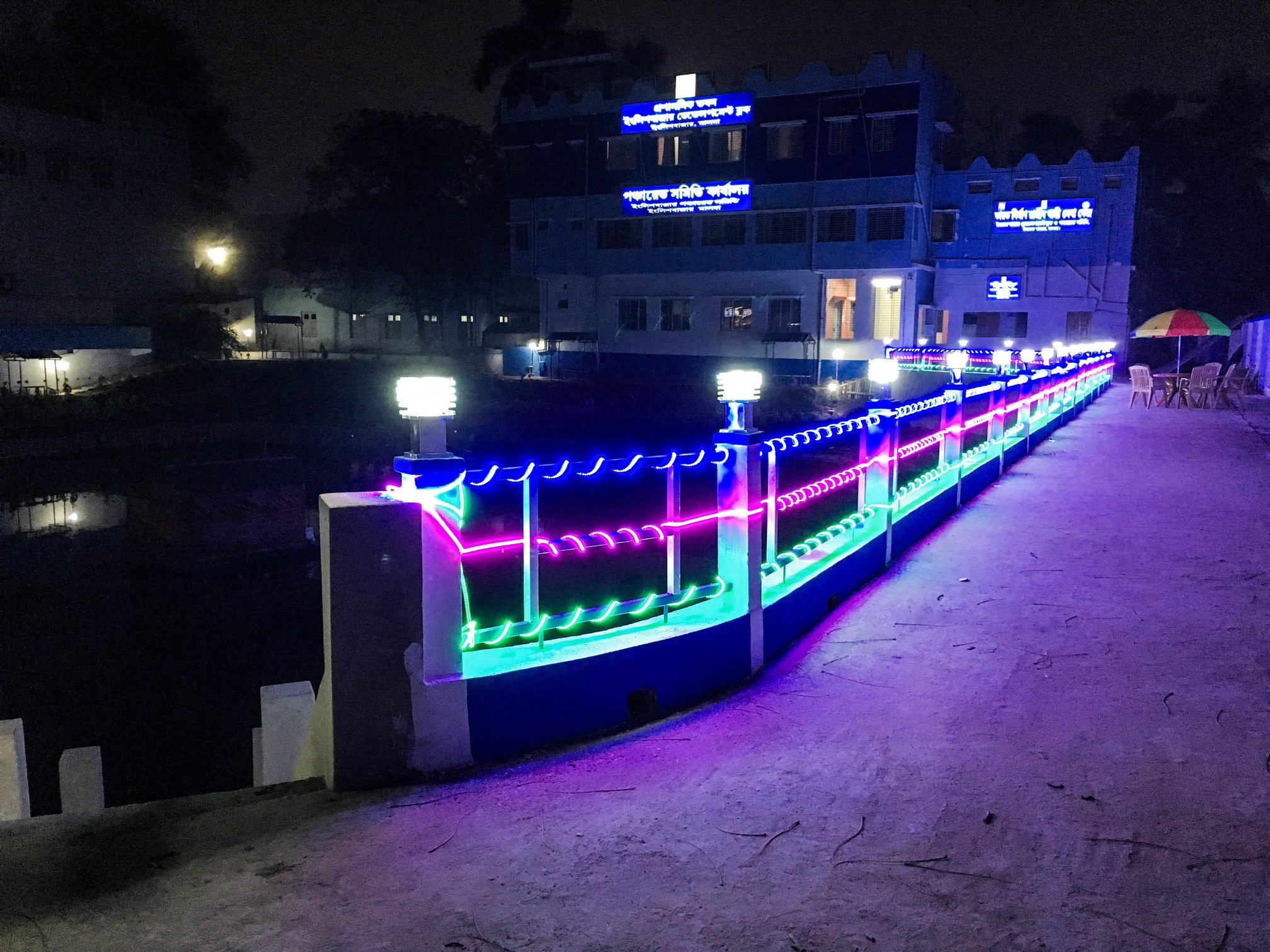

- Coordinates: 24.9166°N 88.1358°E
- Country: India
- State: West Bengal
- District: Maldah

Government
  - Type: Representative democracy

Area
  - Total: 251.85 km^{2} (97.24 sq mi)

Population (2011)
  - Total: 274,627
  - Density: 1,090.4/km^{2} (2,824.2/sq mi)

Languages
  - Official: Bengali, English
- Time zone: UTC+5:30 (IST)
- PIN: 732101, 732102, 732103
- STD/ telephone code: 03512
- Lok Sabha constituency: Maldaha Dakshin
- Vidhan Sabha constituency: English Bazar, Maldah, Manikchak
- Website: malda.nic.in

English Bazar is a community development block that forms an administrative division in Malda Sadar subdivision of Malda district in the Indian state of West Bengal.

== History ==
=== Gauda and Pandua ===
Gauda was once the "capital of the ancient bhukti or political division of Bengal known as Pundravardhana which lay on the eastern extremity of the Gupta Empire." During the rule of the Sena Dynasty, in the 11th-12th century, Gauda was rebuilt and extended as Lakshmanawati (later Lakhnauti), and it became the hub of the Sena empire. Gauda was conquered by Muhammad bin Bakhtiyar Khalji in 1205. During the Turko-Afghan period, "the city of Lakhnauti or Gauda continued to function initially as their capital but was abandoned in 1342 by the Ilyas Shahi sultans in favour of Pandua because of major disturbances along the river course of the Ganga." "Pandua then lay on the banks of the Mahananda, which was the major waterway of the sultanate at the time. However, when the Mahananda too began to veer away from the site of Pandua in the mid-15th century, Gauda was rebuilt and restored to the status of capital city by the Hussain Shahi sultans"... With the ascent of Akbar to the Mughal throne at Delhi... the Mughals annexed the ancient region of Gauda in 1576 and created the Diwani of Bengal. The centre of regional power shifted across the Ganga to Rajmahal. Following the demise of the independent sultanate, the regional importance of the Gauda or Malda region declined irreversibly and the city of Gauda was eventually abandoned.

=== Malda district ===
With the advent of the British, their trading and commercial interests focused on the new cities of Malda and English Bazar. Malda district was formed in 1813 with "some portion of outlying areas of Purnia, Dinajpur and Rajshahi districts". A separate treasury was established in 1832 and a full-fledged Magistrate and Collector was posted in 1859. Malda district was part of Rajshahi Division till 1876, when it was transferred to Bhagalpur Division, and again transferred in 1905 to Rajshahi Division. With the partition of Bengal in 1947, the Radcliffe Line placed Malda district in India, except the Nawabganj subdivision, which was placed in East Pakistan.

== Geography ==
Mahadipur, a constituent panchayat of English Bazar community development block, is located at 24°55′00″N 88°08′09″E.

English Bazar CD Block is part of the Diara, one of the three physiographic subregions of the district. "The Diara is a relatively well drained flat land formed by the fluvial deposition of newer alluvium in the transitional zone between the Barind upland and the marshy Tal tract. The soil is light with sandy appearance and is very fertile. Mango gardens are common and mulberry is also grown in this natural division." It covers 32.16% of the total area of the district. 42.81% of the population of the district live in this sub-region. The Mahananda River flows along the eastern boundary of the CD Block.

English Bazar CD Block is bounded by Ratua II CD Block on the north, Old Malda CD Block on the east, Bholahat Upazila and Shibganj Upazila of Chapai Nawabganj District, Bangladesh, on the south, and Kaliachak III CD Block, Kaliachak I CD Block, Kaliachak II CD Block and Manikchak CD Block on the west.

English Bazar CD Block has an area of 251.85 km^{2}. It has 1 panchayat samity, 11 gram panchayats, 169 gram sansads (village councils), 135 mouzas and 108 inhabited villages. English Bazar police station serves this block. Headquarters of this CD Block is at Malda.

165.5 km of the India-Bangladesh border is in Malda district. CD Blocks on the border are Bamangola, Habibpur, Old Malda, English Bazar and Kaliachak-III.

Mahadipur is a land port and border checkpoint, on the Bangladesh-India border, being developed (in 2018) as an integrated checkpost (ICP) for the smooth movement of goods and people.

Gram panchayats of English Bazar block/ panchayat samiti are: Sovanagar, Milki, Binodpur, Amriti, Phulbaria, Kazigram, Jadupur I, Jadupur II, Mahadipur, Kotwali, Narhatta.

== Demographics ==
=== Population ===
As per 2011 Census of India, English Bazar CD Block had a total population of 274,627, of which 242,797 were rural and 31,830 were urban. There were 140,932 (51%) males and 133,695 (49%) females. Population below 6 years was 39,721. Scheduled Castes numbered 47,532 (17.31%) and Scheduled Tribes numbered 5,187 (1.89%).

Census towns in English Bazar CD Block were (2011 population in brackets): Milki (12,581), Sonatala (10,589) and Bagbari (8,662).

Large villages (with 4,000+ population) in English Bazar CD Block were (2011 population in brackets): Uttar Chandipur (8,807), Bhabanipur (11,930), Khaskol (9,752), Sattari (10,538), Atgama (7,247), Niamatpur (11,089), Phulbaria (5,097), Nagharia (6,408), Lakshmighat (5,543), Jot Basanta (11,438), Anandipur (4,798), Madapur (7,962), Uttar Jadupur (5,911), Dakshin Jadupur (5,623), Bara Phulbari (4,854), Tiakati (4,378) and Mahadipur (8,638).

Other villages in English Bazar CD Block included (2011 population in brackets): Binodpur (595) and Narhatta (1,107).

Decadal Population Growth Rate (%)

Note: The CD Block data for 1971-1981, 1981-1991 and 1991-2001 is for English Bazar PS

The decadal growth of population in English Bazar CD Block in 2001-2011 was 21.39%. The decadal growth of population in English Bazar PS covering English Bazar CD Block in 1991-2001 was 25.38%. The decadal growth of population in English Bazar PS in 1981-91 was 33.48% and in 1971-81 was 30.85%. The decadal growth rate of population in Malda district was as follows: 30.33% in 1951-61, 31.98% in 1961-71, 26.00% in 1971-81, 29.78% in 1981-91, 24.78% in 1991-2001 and 21.22% in 2001-11. The decadal growth rate for West Bengal in 2001-11 was 13.93%. The decadal growth rate for West Bengal was 13.93 in 2001-2011, 17.77% in 1991-2001. 24.73% in 1981-1991 and 23.17% in 1971-1981.

Malda district has the second highest decadal population growth rate, for the decade 2001-2011, in West Bengal with a figure of 21.2% which is much higher than the state average (13.8%). Uttar Dinajpur district has the highest decadal growth rate in the state with 23.2%. Decadal growth rate of population is higher than that of neighbouring Murshidabad district, which has the next highest growth rate.

Population density in the district has intensified from 162 persons per km^{2} in 1901 to 881 in 2001 (i.e., around five times), which is highest amongst the districts of North Bengal. However, unlike the densely populated southern regions of West Bengal, urbanisation remains low in Malda district. North Bengal in general, and Malda in particular, has been witness to large scale population movement from other states in India and other districts of West Bengal, as well as from outside the country. The District Human Development Report for Malda notes, "Malda district has been a principal recipient of the human migration waves of the 20th century."

The decadal growth rate of population in neighbouring Chapai Nawabganj District in Bangladesh was 15.59% for the decade 2001-2011, down from 21.67% in the decade 1991-2001.

There are reports of Bangladeshi infiltrators coming through the international border. Only a small portion of the border with Bangladesh has been fenced and it is popularly referred to as a porous border.

=== Literacy ===
As per the 2011 census, the total number of literates in English Bazar CD Block was 148,061 (63.03% of the population over 6 years) out of which males numbered 80,848 (66.96% of the male population over 6 years) and females numbered 67,213 (58.88% of the female population over 6 years). The gender disparity (the difference between female and male literacy rates) was 8.08%.

See also – List of West Bengal districts ranked by literacy rate

Literacy in CD blocks of
Malda district
Malda Sadar subdivision
Gazole – 63.07%
Bamangola – 68.09%
Habibpur – 58.81%
Old Malda – 59.61%
English Bazar – 63.03%
Manikchak – 57.77%
Kaliachak I – 65.25%
Kaliachak II – 64.89%
Kaliachak III – 54.16%
Chanchal subdivision
Harishchandrapur I – 52.47%
Harishchandrapur II – 54.34%
Chanchal I – 65.09%
Chanchal II – 57.38%
Ratua I – 60.13%
Ratua II – 56.19%
Source: 2011 Census: CD Block Wise
Primary Census Abstract Data

=== Language and religion ===
Religion in English Bazar CD block (2011)
Islam	51.49%
Hinduism	48.34%
Other or not stated	0.17%

Islam is the majority religion, with 51.49% of the population. Hinduism is the second-largest religion.

As per 2014 District Statistical Handbook: Malda (quoting census figures), in the 2001 census, Hindus numbered 114,101 and formed 50.43% of the population in English Bazar CD Block. Muslims numbered 112,029 and formed 49.53% of the population. Christians numbered 52 and formed 0.02% of the population. Others numbered 54 and formed 0.02% of the population.

Bengali is the predominant language, spoken by 97.77% of the population.

== Rural poverty ==
As per the Human Development Report for Malda district, published in 2006, the percentage of rural families in BPL category in English Bazar CD Block was 40.0%. Official surveys have found households living in absolute poverty in Malda district to be around 39%.

According to the report, "An overwhelmingly large segment of the rural workforce depends on agriculture as its main source of livelihood, the extent of landlessness in Malda has traditionally been high because of the high densities of human settlement in the district… Although land reforms were implemented in Malda district from the time they were launched in other parts of West Bengal, their progress has been uneven across the Malda blocks… because of the overall paucity of land, the extent of ceiling-surplus land available for redistribution has never been large… The high levels of rural poverty that exist in nearly all blocks in Malda district closely reflect the livelihood crisis… "

== Economy ==
=== Livelihood ===
Livelihood
in English Bazar CD Block
1. Cultivators (7.73%)
2. Agricultural labourers (23.8%)
3. Household industries (12.5%)
4. Other Workers (56.0%)

In English Bazar CD Block in 2011, amongst the class of total workers, cultivators numbered 7,635 and formed 7.73%, agricultural labourers numbered 23,502 and formed 23.80%, household industry workers numbered 12,311 and formed 12.47% and other workers numbered 55,296 and formed 56.00%. Total workers numbered 98,746 and formed 35.96% of the total population, and non-workers numbered 175,881 and formed 64.04% of the population.

Note: In the census records a person is considered a cultivator, if the person is engaged in cultivation/ supervision of land owned by self/government/institution. When a person who works on another person's land for wages in cash or kind or share, is regarded as an agricultural labourer. Household industry is defined as an industry conducted by one or more members of the family within the household or village, and one that does not qualify for registration as a factory under the Factories Act. Other workers are persons engaged in some economic activity other than cultivators, agricultural labourers and household workers. It includes factory, mining, plantation, transport and office workers, those engaged in business and commerce, teachers, entertainment artistes and so on.

=== Infrastructure ===
There are 108 inhabited villages in English Bazar CD Block. All 112 villages (100%) have power supply. 101 villages (93.52%) have drinking water supply. 21 villages (19.44%) have post offices. 90 villages (83.33%) have telephones (including landlines, public call offices and mobile phones). 35 villages (32.41%) have a pucca (paved) approach road and 29 villages (26.85%) have transport communication (includes bus service, rail facility and navigable waterways). 5 villages (4.63%) have agricultural credit societies. 6 villages (5.56%) have banks.

=== Agriculture ===
"Large parts of the Diara, now the most intensely settled region within Malda, began to attract a new population from the early 20th century, after the alluvial chars exposed by the Ganga’s westward migration were opened for revenue settlement… Agricultural land in the Tal and Diara is mostly irrigated and intensively cropped and cultivated… Rainfall in the district is moderate…"

English Bazar CD Block had 63 fertiliser depots, 11 seed stores and 50 fair price shops in 2013-14.

In 2013-14, English Bazar CD Block produced 130,875 tonnes of Aman paddy, the main winter crop from 32,122 hectares, 7,152 tonnes of Boro paddy (spring crop) from 1,779 hectares, 614 tonnes of Aus paddy (summer crop) from 316 hectares, 6,788 tonnes of wheat from 2,348 hectares, 1,013 tonnes of maize from 247 hectares, 5,928 tonnes of jute from 263 hectares, 472 tonnes of potatoes from 14 hectares and 803 tonnes of sugar cane from 9 hectares. It also produced pulses and oilseeds.

In 2013-14, the total area irrigated in English Bazar CD Block was 6,531 hectares, out of which 580 hectares were irrigated by river lift irrigation, 1,054 hectares by deep tube wells, 2,876 hectares by shallow tube wells and 2,021 hectares by other means.

=== Mango ===
25,500 hectares of land in Malda district produces mango varieties such as langra, himasagar, amrapali, laxmanbhog, gopalbhog and fazli. The core area of mango production is Old Malda, English Bazar and Manikchak CD Blocks, from where it has spread to Kaliachak I & II, Ratua I & II and Chanchal I CD Blocks.

=== Backward Regions Grant Fund ===
Malda district is listed as a backward region and receives financial support from the Backward Regions Grant Fund. The fund, created by the Government of India, is designed to redress regional imbalances in development. As of 2012, 272 districts across the country were listed under this scheme. The list includes 11 districts of West Bengal.

== Transport ==
In 2013-14, English Bazar CD Block had 7 originating/ terminating bus routes.

There is a station at Malda Town on the Howrah–New Jalpaiguri line.

NH 12 (old number NH 34) passes through English Bazar CD Block.

== Education ==
In 2013-14, English Bazar CD Block had 140 primary schools with 21,948 students, 8 middle schools with 1,354 students, 11 high schools with 17,722 students and 16 higher secondary schools with 25,050 students. English Bazar CD Block had 7 technical/ professional institutions with 1,317 students and 390 institutions for special and non-formal education with 13,689 students.

As per the 2011 census, in English Bazar CD Block, amongst the 106 inhabited villages, 14 villages did not have a school, 62 villages had more than 1 primary school, 32 villages had at least 1 primary and 1 middle school and 20 villages had at least 1 middle and 1 secondary school.

== Healthcare ==
In 2014, English Bazar CD Block had 1 block primary health centre, 2 primary health centres and 2 nursing homes with total 170 beds and 13 doctors (excluding private bodies). It had 33 family welfare subcentres. 8,927 patients were treated indoor and 130,169 patients were treated outdoor in the hospitals, health centres and subcentres of the CD Block.

Milki Rural Hospital at Milki (with 30 beds) is the main medical facility in English Bazar CD Block. There are primary health centres at KG Chandipur (Chandipur PHC) (with 10 beds) and Mahadipur (with 10 beds).
