= Uttar Jadupur =

- Village
- Location in West Bengal, India Uttar Jadupur (India)
- Coordinates: 24.98°N 88.11°E
- Country: India
- State: West Bengal
- District: Malda

Government
  - Type: Gram panchayat

Population (2011)
  - Total: 5,911

Languages
  - Official: Bengali, English
- Time zone: UTC+5:30 (IST)
- PIN: 732103
- Lok Sabha constituency: Malda Dakshin
- Vidhan Sabha constituency: English Bazar

Uttar Jadupur is a village located in English Bazar CD block of the Malda district in the state of West Bengal, India.
