= IMPS College of Engineering and Technology =

College in West Bengal

- Type: Private Engineering college
- Established: 2003
- Affiliations: Maulana Abul Kalam Azad University of Technology
- Principal: Dr. Sudipta Das
- Location: Vidyasagar Rd, Azimpur, Uttar Jadupur, Malda, West Bengal, 732103, India; 24.9915°N 88.0995°E
- Campus: Urban
- Approvals: AICTE
- Website: www.impscet.net
- Location within West Bengal Location within India

IMPS College of Engineering and Technology (IMPSCET) is an engineering college located in Uttar Jadupur, Malda, West Bengal, India. The college was established in 2003, Run by the IMPS Educational Trust. The college is an AICTE-approved institution and is affiliated to the Maulana Abul Kalam Azad University of Technology.

== Academics ==
This college offers Bachelor of Technology (B.Tech) in Computer Science & Technology, Electronics & Communication Engineering, Civil Engineering and Electrical Engineering courses which are affiliated to Maulana Abul Kalam Azad University of Technology. It was also offered Diploma in Engineering (Dip.Eng.) courses in the Jalpaiguri branch between 2015 and 2025 in Computer Science & Technology, Civil Engineering, Electrical Engineering, and Mechanical Engineering, which was affiliated with West Bengal State Council of Technical and Vocational Education and Skill Development.
