= Pakuahat =

Village in Malda (West Bengal), India

Pakuahat Mirzapur
- Village
- Location in West Bengal, India Pakuahat (India)
- Coordinates: 25.1253°N 88.3676°E
- Country: India
- State: West Bengal
- District: Malda

Population (2011)
  - Total: 3,010

Languages
  - Official: Bengali, English
- Time zone: UTC+5:30 (IST)
- PIN: 732138
- STD/ Telephone code: 03512
- Lok Sabha constituency: Maldaha Uttar
- Vidhan Sabha constituency: Habibpur
- Website: malda.nic.in

Pakuahat is a village in the Bamangola CD block in the Malda Sadar subdivision of Malda district in the state of West Bengal, India.

== Geography ==
Cities, towns and locations in the northern portion of Malda district (including Chanchal subdivision and Old Malda, Habibpur, Bamangola and Gazole CD blocks)
M: municipal town, CT: census town, R: rural/ urban centre, F: Facility, H: historical centre
Owing to space constraints in the small map, the actual locations in a larger map may vary slightly

=== Location ===
Pakuahat is located at 25.1253°N 88.3676°E

=== Area overview ===
The area shown in the adjacent map covers two physiographic regions – the Barind in the east and the tal in the west. The eastern part is comparatively high (up to 40 metres above mean sea level at places) and uneven. The soils of the eastern region are "hard salty clays of a reddish hue and the ground is baked hard as iron." It lies to the east of the Mahananda River. The area lying to the west of the Mahananda River, the tal, is a flat low land and "is strewn with innumerable marshes, bils and oxbow lakes." The tal area is prone to flooding by local rivers. The total area is overwhelmingly rural. There are two important historical/ archaeological sites in the area – Pandua and Jagjivanpur.

Note: The map alongside presents some of the notable locations in the area. All places marked in the map are linked in the larger full screen map.

== Civic administration ==
=== CD block HQ ===
The headquarters of Bamangola CD block is at Pakuahat.

== Demographics ==
According to the 2011 Census of India, Mirzapur (Pakuahat) had a total population of 3,010, of which 1,562 (52%) were males and 1,448 (48%) were females. Population in the age range 0–6 years was 276. The total number of literate persons in Mirzapur (Pakuahat) was 2,227 (81.46% of the population over 6 years).

== Transport ==
It is on the Nalagola-Pakuahat-Malda Road.

== Education ==
Pakuahat Degree College was established in 1997 and is affiliated to the University of Gour Banga. It offers honours courses in Bengali, English, history, sociology and political science, and general courses in arts and science.
