= Sahapur, Malda =

Sahapur
- Neighborhood in Malda City
- Location in West Bengal, India Sahapur (India)
- Coordinates: 24.99336°N 88.15276°E
- Country: India
- State: West Bengal
- District: Malda

Area
  - Total: 1.8292 km^{2} (0.7063 sq mi)

Population (2011)
  - Total: 9,906
  - Density: 5,415/km^{2} (14,030/sq mi)

Languages
  - Official: Bengali, English
- Time zone: UTC+5:30 (IST)
- PIN: 732142
- Telephone/ STD code: 03512
- Vehicle registration: WB
- Lok Sabha constituency: Maldaha Uttar
- Vidhan Sabha constituency: Maldaha
- Website: malda.nic.in

Sahapur is a suburb of Old Malda in Malda district of West Bengal, India.

== Geography ==
Cities, towns and locations in the northern portion of Malda district (including Chanchal subdivision and Old Malda, Habibpur, Bamangola and Gazole CD blocks)
M: municipal town, CT: census town, R: rural/ urban centre, F: Facility, H: historical centre
Owing to space constraints in the small map, the actual locations in a larger map may vary slightly

=== Location ===
Sahapur is located at 24.99336°N 88.15276°E.

== Demographics ==
According to the 2011 Census of India, Sahapur had a total population of 9,906, of which 5,082 (51%) were males and 4,824 (49%) were females. Population in the age range 0–6 years was 1,112. The total number of literate persons in Sahapur was 6,119 (69.58% of the population over 6 years).

== Infrastructure ==
According to the District Census Handbook, Maldah, 2011, Sahapur covered an area of 1.8292 km^{2}. The protected water-supply involved overhead tank, tube well/ bore well, hand pump. It had 871 domestic electric connections. Among the medical facilities it had 1 dispensary/ health centre, 4 maternity and child welfare centres, 10 medicine shops. Among the educational facilities, it had 5 primary schools, 2 middle schools. Among the social, cultural and recreational facilities it had 1 orphanage home, 1 public library, 1 reading room. It produced fish, beedi, coke.
