= Panchanandapur =

- Village
- Nickname: Pagla Ghat
- Location in West Bengal, India Panchanandapur (India)
- Coordinates: 24.9440°N 87.9776°E
- Country: India
- State: West Bengal
- District: Malda

Area
  - Total: 23.0187 km^{2} (8.8876 sq mi)

Population (2011)
  - Total: 26,358
  - Density: 1,145.1/km^{2} (2,965.7/sq mi)

Languages
  - Official: Bengali, English
- Time zone: UTC+5:30 (IST)
- PIN: 732207
- STD/ Telephone code: 03512
- Lok Sabha constituency: Maldaha Dakshin
- Vidhan Sabha constituency: Mothabari
- Website: malda.nic.in

Panchanandapur (also known as Pagla Ghat) is the largest village in the eastern side of Ganga River in the Kaliachak II CD block in the Malda Sadar subdivision of Malda district in the state of West Bengal, India.

== History ==
Panchanandapur is located in the border area along the river Ganges flowing between Jharkhand and West Bengal. It is also known for flooding and is a very poor area in Malda district. The area is also known as Pagla Ghat because 1998 Ganga Rivers flood was very madly affected the area and damaged many houses.

== Geography ==
Cities, towns and locations in the southern portion of Malda district (including Kaliachak I, Kaliachak II, Kaliachak III, Manikchak and English Bazar CD blocks)
M: municipal town, CT: census town, R: rural/ urban centre, F: Facility, H: historical centre
Owing to space constraints in the small map, the actual locations in a larger map may vary slightly

=== Location ===
Panchanandapur is located at 24.9440°N 88.9776°E Malda district, West Bengal. It has an average elevation of 17 metres (56 feet). It is on the eastern bank of the river Ganges.As in much of Bengal, the weather is usually extremely humid and tropical. Temperatures can reach as high as 46 °C during the day in May and June and fall as low as 4 °C overnight in December and January.

The Panchanandapur area is vulnerable to floods from the adjoining Ganges.

=== Area overview ===
The area shown in the adjoining map is the physiographic sub-region known as the diara. It "is a relatively well drained flat land formed by the fluvial deposition of newer alluvium." The most note-worthy feature is the Farakka Barrage across the Ganges. The area is a part of the Malda Sadar subdivision, which is an overwhelmingly rural region, but the area shown in the map has pockets of urbanization with 17 census towns, concentrated mostly in the Kaliachak I CD block. The bank of the Ganges between Bhutni and Panchanandapur (both the places are marked on the map), is the area worst hit by left bank erosion, a major problem in the Malda area. The ruins of Gauda, capital of several empires, is located in this area.

Note: The map alongside presents some of the notable locations in the area. All places marked in the map are linked in the larger full screen map.

=== River bank erosion ===
Upstream of the Farakka Barrage, Kaliachak II CD block is one of the areas badly affected, over three decades prior to 1999, by the left bank erosion of the Ganges. The river stretch between Bhutnidiara and Panchanandapur, is the worst hit area. "Even 40 years back (from 1999), Panchanandapur was a flourishing river-port and trading centre. Apart from block headquarter, high school, sugar mill it had a regular weekly market where traders used to come by large boats from Rajmahal, Sahebganj, Dhulian. Today’s Panchanandapur has shifted to Chethrumahajantola after going through the eroding process of 5/6 years." A survey by the Nagarik Committee has estimated the loss of 750 km^{2} in the Kaliachak-Manikchak area, in 30 years prior to 1999.

== Demographics ==
According to the 2011 Census of India, Panchanandapur had a total population of 26,358, of which 13,512 (51%) were males and 12,486 (49%) were females. Population in the age range 0–6 years was 4,370. The total number of literate persons in Panchanadapur was 13,578 (61.75% of the population over 6 years).
