= Bhutni, Malda =

Island in west bengal, India

- Location within West Bengal

Geography
- Location: Ganges
- Archipelago: Manikchak

Administration
- India
- State: West Bengal
- District: Malda

Demographics
- Population: 89021

Bhutni is an island in the Malda district of West Bengal, India. The island is part of the Manikchak community development block and is surrounded by the Ganga River and the Fulhar river.

== Geography ==
Cities, towns and locations in the southern portion of Malda district (including Kaliachak I, Kaliachak II, Kaliachak III, Manikchak and English Bazar CD blocks)
M: municipal town, CT: census town, R: rural/ urban centre, F: Facility, H: historical centre
Owing to space constraints in the small map, the actual locations in a larger map may vary slightly

=== Location ===
The island is located at 25.1307°N 87.8709°E. Bhutni is an island fully bounded by the river Ganges and the Fulahar river.

=== Area overview ===
The area shown in the adjoining map is the physiographic sub-region known as the diara. It “is a relatively well drained flat land formed by the fluvial deposition of newer alluvium.” The most note-worthy feature is the Farakka Barrage across the Ganges. The area is a part of the Malda Sadar subdivision, which is an overwhelmingly rural region, but the area shown in the map has pockets of urbanization with 17 census towns, concentrated mostly in the Kaliachak I CD block. The bank of the Ganges between Bhutni and Panchanandapur (both the places are marked on the map), is the area worst hit by left bank erosion, a major problem in the Malda area. The ruins of Gauda, capital of several empires, is located in this area.

Note: The map alongside presents some of the notable locations in the area. All places marked in the map are linked in the larger full screen map.

== Demographics ==
The island has 3 out of the 7 gram panchayats of the Manikchak Block. They are Dakshin Chandipur, Uttar Chandipur, and Hiranandapur. At the 2011 Census of India, Bhutni island had a total population of 89021, of which 46052 are male, while 42969 are females. Scheduled Castes numbered are 30149 and Scheduled Tribes numbered are 33063.

There are approximately 63 villages in Bhutni. It has three high schools, Bhutni Chandipur High School, Amtola Nanditola High School, Uttar Chandipur BP High School,one senior madrasa, one government sponsored library, five post offices, four commercial banks, and one rural hospital. The only way to travel to Bhutni was by boat, but a 1.8-kilometre-long (1.1 mi) bridge has been made now. This has been opened to the public in 2019. The bridge is funded by the North Bengal Development Board, part of the government of West Bengal.
