= Urbanisation in India =

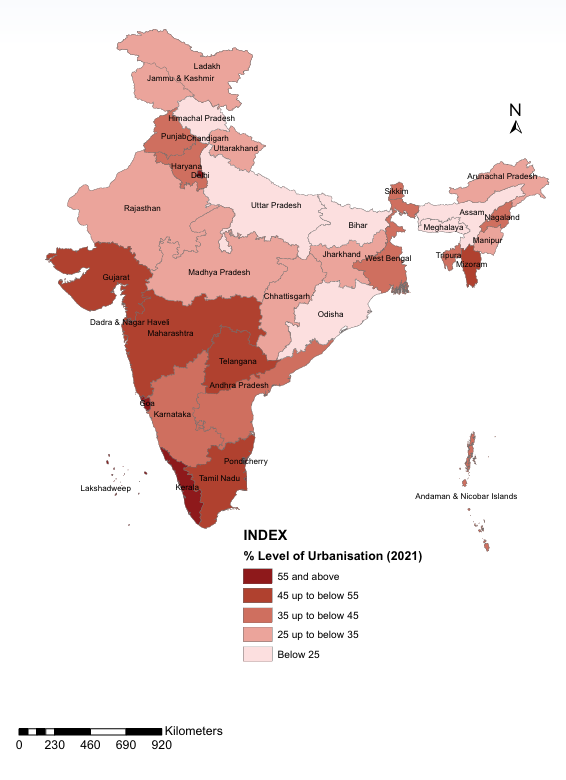
Level of Urbanisation in India 2021

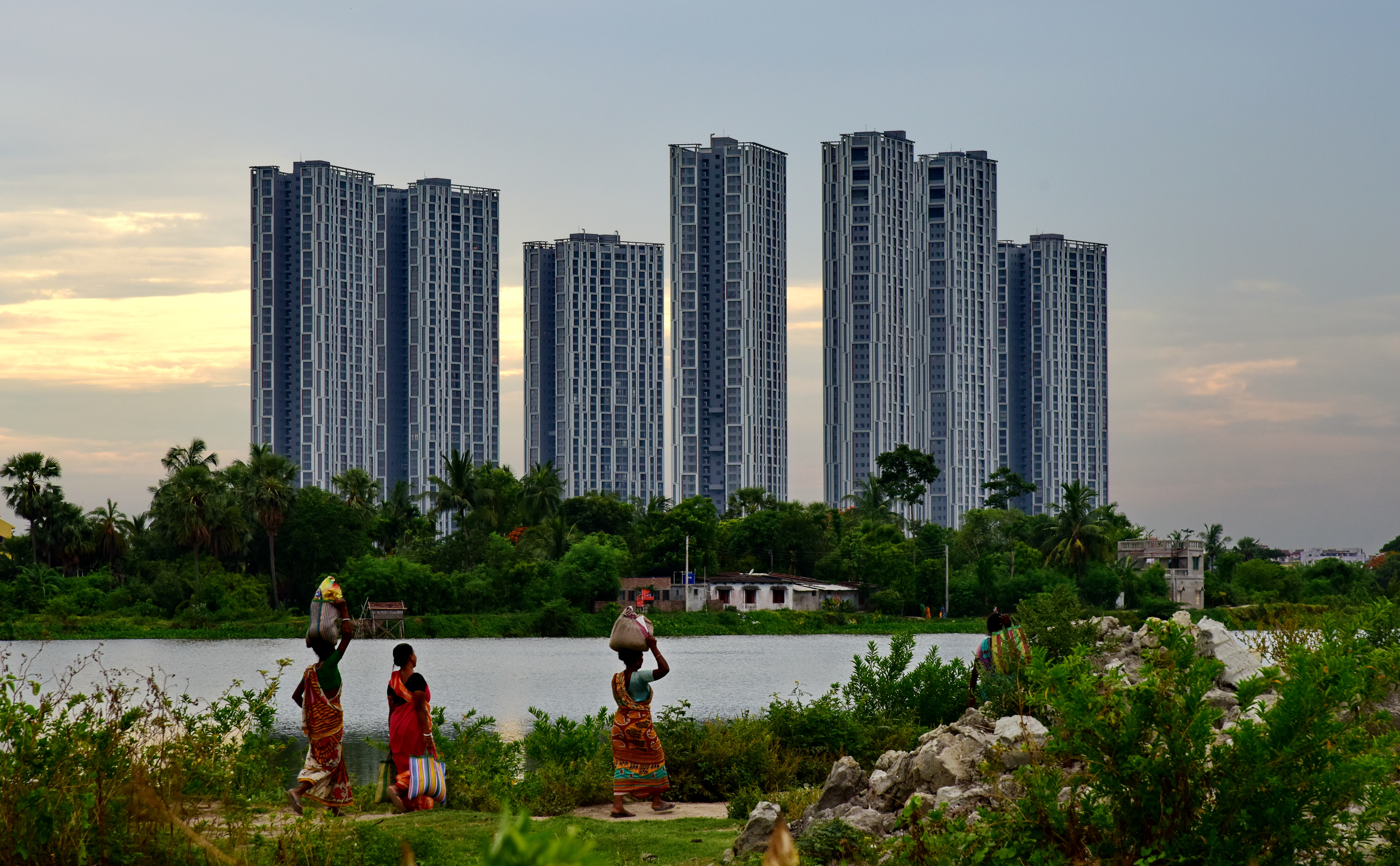
Urbanisation in Outskirts of Kolkata

Urbanisation in India is the increase in the share of India's population living in cities and metropolitan areas. The population residing in urban areas in India, according to the 1901 census, was 11.4%, increasing to 28.53% by the 2001 census, and stood at 35.69% in 2025 according to the World Bank. According to a survey by the United Nations, in 2030 40.76% of country's population is expected to reside in urban areas. As per the World Bank, India, along with China, Indonesia, Nigeria, and the United States, will lead the world's urban population surge by 2050.

Mumbai saw large-scale rural-urban migration in the 20th century. In 2018, Mumbai accommodated 22.1 million people, and was the second-largest metropolis by population in India. Delhi has 28 million inhabitants as per the 2011 census of India.

== History ==
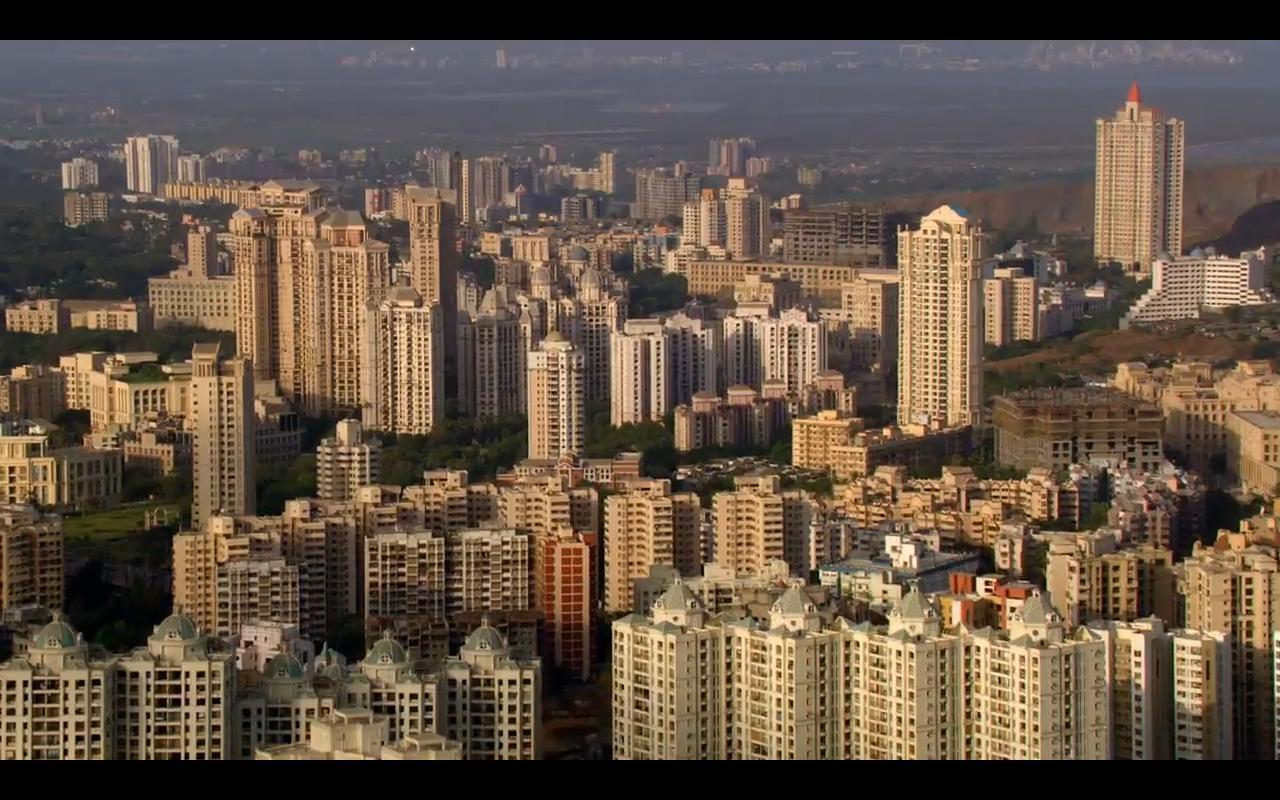
Navi Mumbai is a planned city, built to accommodate the growing urban population of Mumbai

Post-independence, India faced high rates of poverty, unemployment, and a stagnant economy. Post-independence India focused on the domain of science and technology. The mixed economy system was adopted, resulting in the growth of the Public sector in India crippling down the development of Indian economy leading to what is popularly known as Hindu rate of growth. The South Asian region though predominantly rural (accounting for 69.9% rural population as of 2010), has recorded much higher annual growth of urban population. India, the leading country in South Asia has shown an unprecedented increase in the urban population in the last few decades and its urban population has increased about 14 fold from 1901 to 2011. This growth is mainly uneven but not skewed and not concentrated to a single city of the country. India shares most characteristic features of urbanisation in the developing countries where the rate of urbanisation is faster than the developed countries. For instance, in 1971 there were only about 150 cities whose population was more than one lakh, now this figure has reached to 500. The urban population of India has increased from 25.85 million in 1901 to 377.11 million in 2011.

Urban Population of India (1960–2025)
Year	Population	% of total
1960	79,932,899	17.92
1965	93,946,480	18.79
1970	110,162,257	19.76
1975	133,010,186	21.33
1980	160,953,420	23.10
1985	189,973,343	24.35
1990	222,374,415	25.55
1995	256,565,748	26.61
2000	293,168,849	27.67
2005	337,558,628	29.24
2010	383,721,793	30.93
2015	433,595,954	32.78
2020	487,702,168	34.93
2025	542,742,539	37.08

=== Modern India ===
Map of the urban/total population ratio of Indian states, as per the 2011 census

Since 1941, India has witnessed the rapid growth of its four largest metropolitan cities: Kolkata, Delhi, Mumbai, and Chennai. The growth of the public sector resulted in development of public transport, roads, water supply, electricity, and other infrastructure of urban areas.

As the percentage contribution of the secondary sector to India's GDP has increased, the percentage contribution from the agricultural sector has declined. It is estimated that the agricultural sector provides employment to 50% of the country's workforce, but accounts for only 18% of the GDP. Many farmers in different states of India are leaving farming, primarily because of high input cost and low income from agriculture. Also, the prolonged use of fertilizers, chemicals, and hybrid seeds has led to a decline in land fertility. Struggling to make a living, many farmers have committed suicide.

Maharashtra was the most urbanized major state in India till 1991, stood behind Tamil Nadu in 2001 and third after it in 2011, with Kerala being second, with the urban-total state population ratio. However, Maharashtra's urban population of 50 million, far exceeds that of Tamil Nadu which is at 34 million, as per the 2011 census. The spatial distribution of large cities in India is uneven as out of 100 most populous cities in the country more than 50 are confined to only 5 states namely, Uttar Pradesh, Maharashtra, Tamil Nadu, Kerala and Andhra Pradesh. The World Bank estimated in 2011 that two thirds of India's GDP was generated in cities.

In 2014, World Bank projected that by 2030, India's top five cities would have economies comparable to middle income countries in 2014.

The rapid expansion of Indian cities has frequently led to the encroachment of natural ecosystems. Wetlands in Indian cities, such as lakes, floodplains, and marshes, have faced significant degradation due to unplanned construction and infrastructure development. While these water bodies provide essential services like flood mitigation and groundwater recharge, they are often missing from formal urban planning discourse.

== Causes of urbanisation in India ==
The main causes of urbanisation in India are:

- Expansion in government services, as a result of the Second World War
- Migration of people during the partition of India
- Industrial development in urban areas
- India's eleventh Five-Year Plan, which targeted urbanisation as a means to accelerate economic development
- Economic opportunities, including employment
- Better opportunities for education
- Infrastructure facilities in urban areas
- Growth of the private sector after 1990
- Land fragmentation: some villages have been erased due to construction of roads, highways, dams, and other infrastructure
- Non-profitability of farming

== Bibliography ==
- Ballhatchet, Kenneth; Harrison, John (1980). The City in South Asia: Pre-Modern and Modern. Curzon Press. ISBN 9780391011298.
