= Maldaha Dakshin Lok Sabha constituency =

Lok Sabha Constituency in West Bengal

Coordinates: 24°51′06″N 88°00′39″E

Maldaha Dakshin WB-8
- Lok Sabha constituency
- Interactive Map Outlining Maldaha Dakshin Lok Sabha Constituency

Constituency details
- Country: India
- Region: East India
- State: West Bengal
- Assembly constituencies: Manikchak; English Bazar; Mothabari; Sujapur; Baisnabnagar; Farakka; Samserganj
- Established: 2009
- Total electors: 1,347,143
- Reservation: None

Member of Parliament
- 18th Lok Sabha
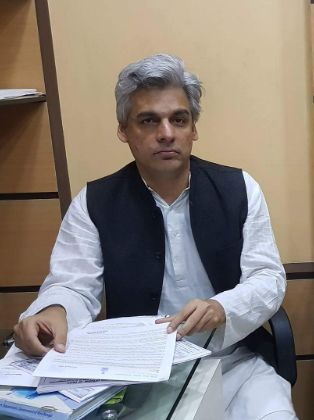
- Incumbent Isha Khan Choudhury
- Party: INC
- Alliance: INDIA
- Elected year: 2024

Maldaha Dakshin Lok Sabha constituency is one of the 543 parliamentary constituencies in Malda district, West Bengal, India. It is considered to be a bastion of the Indian National Congress. While five of the assembly segments of No. 8 Maldaha Dakshin Lok Sabha constituency are in Malda district in West Bengal, two assembly segments are in Murshidabad district. As per order of the Delimitation Commission in respect of the delimitation of constituencies in the West Bengal, Malda Lok Sabha constituency ceased to exist from 2009 and two new ones came into being: Maldaha Uttar Lok Sabha constituency and Maldaha Dakshin Lok Sabha constituency.

== Assembly segments ==
Parliamentary constituencies in West Bengal - 1. Cooch Behar, 2. Alipurduars, 3. Jalpaiguri, 4. Darjeeling, 5. Raiganj, 6. Balurghat, 7. Maldaha Uttar, 8. Maldaha Dakshin, 9. Jangipur, 10. Baharampur, 11. Murshidabad, 12. Krishnanagar, 13. Ranaghat, 14. Bangaon, 15. Barrackpore, 16. Dum Dum, 17. Barasat, 18. Basirhat, 19. Jaynagar, 20. Mathurapur, 21. Diamond Harbour, 22. Jadavpur, 23. Kolkata Dakshin, 24. Kolkata Uttar, 25. Howrah, 26. Uluberia, 27. Serampore, 28. Hooghly, 29. Arambagh, 30. Tamluk, 31, Kanthi, 32. Ghatal, 33. Jhargram, 34. Medinipur, 35. Purulia, 36. Bankura, 37. Bishnupur, 38. Bardhaman Purba, 39. Bardhaman Durgapur, 40. Asansol, 41. Bolpur, 42. Birbhum

Maldaha Dakshin Lok Sabha constituency (parliamentary constituency no. 8) is composed of the following assembly segments:

| # | Name | District | Member | Party | 2024 Lead |
|---|---|---|---|---|---|
| 49 | Manikchak | Malda | Gour Chandra Mandal | BJP | BJP |
| 51 | English Bazar | Malda | Amlan Bhaduri | BJP | BJP |
| 52 | Mothabari | Malda | Mohammad Najrul Islam | AITC | INC |
| 53 | Sujapur | Malda | Sabina Yeasmin | AITC | INC |
| 54 | Baisnabnagar | Malda | Raju Karmakar | BJP | BJP |
| 55 | Farakka | Murshidabad | Motab Shaikh | INC | INC |
| 56 | Samserganj | Murshidabad | Mohammad Noor Alam | AITC | INC |

== Members of Parliament ==
| Year | Name | Party |
|---|---|---|
Till 2008 : See Malda
| 2009 | Abu Hasem Khan Choudhury | Indian National Congress |
| 2014 | Abu Hasem Khan Choudhury | Indian National Congress |
| 2019 | Abu Hasem Khan Choudhury | Indian National Congress |
| 2024 | Isha Khan Choudhury | Indian National Congress |

== Election results ==
=== General election 2024 ===
2024 Indian general elections: Maldaha Dakshin
| Party | Candidate | Votes | % | ±% |
|---|---|---|---|---|
| INC | Isha Khan Choudhury | 572,395 | 41.79 | ▲7.06 |
| BJP | Sreerupa Mitra Chaudhury | 4,44,027 | 32.42 | ▼1.67 |
| AITC | Shahnawaz Ali Raihan | 3,01,026 | 21.98 | ▼5.49 |
| NOTA | None of the above | 2,797 | 0.20 | ▼0.74 |
| Majority | | 1,28,368 | 9.37 | |
| Turnout | | 13,69,789 | 76.69 | ▼4.55 |
| INC hold | | Swing | | |

=== General election 2019 ===
Source:Source

2019 Indian general election: Maldaha Dakshin
| Party | Candidate | Votes | % | ±% |
|---|---|---|---|---|
| INC | Abu Hasem Khan Choudhury | 444,270 | 34.73 | −0.08 |
| BJP | Sreerupa Mitra Chaudhury | 436,048 | 34.09 | +14.02 |
| AITC | Md Moazzem Hossain | 351,353 | 27.47 | +6.84 |
| Independent | Debojit Mandal | 9,430 | 0.74 | N/A |
| BSP | Fulchand Mandal | 6,190 | 0.48 | −0.08 |
| SUCI | Angushudhar Mandal | 5,605 | 0.44 | N/A |
| NOTA | None of the above | 12,062 | 0.94 | +0.17 |
| Majority | | 8,222 | 0.64 | −14.38 |
| Turnout | | 1,279,977 | 81.24 | +0.15 |
| Registered electors | | 1,575,590 | | |
| INC hold | | Swing | -7.05 | |

=== General election 2014 ===
2014 Indian general elections: Maldaha Dakshin
| Party | Candidate | Votes | % | ±% |
|---|---|---|---|---|
| INC | Abu Hasem Khan Choudhury | 380,291 | 34.81 | −18.64 |
| BJP | Bishnupada Roy | 216,181 | 19.79 | +14.49 |
| CPI(M) | Abul Hasnat Khan | 209,480 | 19.18 | −17.84 |
| AITC | Md Moazzem Hossain | 192,632 | 17.63 | N/A |
| AIUDF | Md. Najrul Islam | 21,207 | 1.94 | N/A |
| SDPI | Imtiaz Ahmed Mollah | 12,952 | 1.18 | N/A |
| Independent | Manjur Alahi Munshi | 11,426 | 1.04 | +0.66 |
| Independent | Sadhan Chatterjee | 10,536 | 0.96 | N/A |
| Independent | Naresh Rishi | 6,616 | 0.60 | N/A |
| BSP | Nikhil Chandra Mondal | 6,138 | 0.56 | −0.14 |
| Jamat-E-Seratul Mustakim | Md Ezaruddin | 3,377 | 0.30 | N/A |
| IUML | Md Faruque Hossain | 3,282 | 0.30 | −0.39 |
| RPI | Murshed Shekh | 2,720 | 0.24 | N/A |
| PDS | Nasmul Hoque | 2,466 | 0.22 | N/A |
| JDP | Bimal Mardi | 1,921 | 0.17 | N/A |
| RJSP | Dipak Singh | 1449 | 0.13 | N/A |
| BMP | Firoz Akhtar | 1,342 | 0.12 | N/A |
| NOTA | None of the above | 8,392 | 0.77 | N/A |
| Majority | | 164,111 | 15.02 | −1.41 |
| Turnout | | 1,092,407 | 81.09 | +2.25 |
| INC hold | | Swing | -18.84 | |

=== General election 2009 ===
General Election, 2009: Maldaha Dakshin
| Party | Candidate | Votes | % | ±% |
|---|---|---|---|---|
| INC | Abu Hasem Khan Choudhury | 443,377 | 53.45 | |
| CPI(M) | Abdur Razzaque | 307,097 | 37.04 | |
| BJP | Dipak Kumar Chowdhury | 43,997 | 5.30 | |
| BSP | Dr. Bharat Chandra Mandal | 5,889 | 0.70 | |
| IUML | Md. Ejaruddin | 5,752 | 0.69 | |
| Independent | Manjur Alahi Munshi | 3,167 | 0.38 | |
| Independent | Md. Kamal Basirujjaman | 3,411 | 0.41 | |
| Independent | Rustam Ali | 5,944 | 0.71 | |
| Independent | Shyamal Das | 10,852 | 1.30 | |
| Majority | | 136,280 | 16.41 | |
| Turnout | | 829,482 | 78.84 | |
| INC win (new seat) | | | | |

== See also ==
- List of constituencies of the Lok Sabha
