= Habibpur (disambiguation) =

Habibpur is a town in Bhagalpur, Bihar, India

Habibpur may also refer to:

- Habibpur, Malda, a village in Malda district, West Bengal, India

- Habibpur (community development block), in Malda district, West Bengal, India
- Habibpur (Vidhan Sabha constituency), in Malda district, West Bengal, India

- Habibpur, Nadia, a village in Nadia district, West Bengal, India
- Habibpur Union, a rural union in Sunamganj district, Bangladesh
