= Kendua, West Bengal =

Kendua
- Census Town
- Location in West Bengal, India Kendua (India) Kendua (Asia)
- Coordinates: 24.9831795°N 88.2475090°E
- Country: India
- State: West Bengal
- District: Malda

Area
  - Total: 1.2 km^{2} (0.46 sq mi)

Population (2011)
  - Total: 6,452
  - Density: 5,400/km^{2} (14,000/sq mi)

Languages
  - Official: Bengali
  - Additional official: English
- Time zone: UTC+5:30 (IST)
- PIN: 732121
- Telephone/ STD code: 03511
- ISO 3166 code: IN-WB
- Vehicle registration: WB
- Lok Sabha constituency: Maldaha Uttar
- Vidhan Sabha constituency: Habibpur
- Website: malda.nic.in

Kendua is a census town in the Habibpur CD block in the Malda Sadar subdivision of Malda district in the Indian state of West Bengal.

== Geography ==
Cities, towns and locations in the northern portion of Malda district (including Chanchal subdivision and Old Malda, Habibpur, Bamangola and Gazole CD blocks)
M: municipal town, CT: census town, R: rural/ urban centre, F: Facility, H: historical centre
Owing to space constraints in the small map, the actual locations in a larger map may vary slightly

=== Location ===
Kendua is located at 24°58′59″N 88°14′51″E.

=== Area overview ===
The area shown in the adjacent map covers two physiographic regions – the Barind in the east and the tal in the west. The eastern part is comparatively high (up to 40 metres above mean sea level at places) and uneven. The soils of the eastern region are “hard salty clays of a reddish hue and the ground is baked hard as iron.” It lies to the east of the Mahananda River. The area lying to the west of the Mahananda River, the tal, is a flat low land and “is strewn with innumerable marshes, bils and oxbow lakes.” The tal area is prone to flooding by local rivers. The total area is overwhelmingly rural. There are two important historical/ archaeological sites in the area – Pandua and Jagjivanpur.

Note: The map alongside presents some of the notable locations in the area. All places marked in the map are linked in the larger full screen map.

== Demographics ==
According to the 2011 Census of India, Kendua had a total population of 6,452, of which 3,296 (51%) were males and 3,156 (49%) were females. Population in the age range 0–6 years was 673. The total number of literate persons in Kendua was 4,614 (79.84% of the population over 6 years).

As of 2001 India census, Kendua had a population of 5,768. Males constitute 51% of the population and females 49%. Kendua has an average literacy rate of 62%, higher than the national average of 59.5%: male literacy is 71%, and female literacy is 53%. In Kendua, 13% of the population is under 6 years of age.

== Infrastructure ==
According to the District Census Handbook, Maldah, 2011, Kendua covered an area of 1.2 km^{2}. It had 3 km roads with both open and closed drains. The protected water-supply involved overhead tank, tap water from treated sources, tube well/ bore well. It had 608 domestic electric connections. Among the educational facilities, it had 1 primary school in town, the nearest secondary school at Kachu Pukur 3 km away. It had 1 non-formal education centre (Sarva Shiksha Abhiyan). Among the social, cultural and recreational facilities it had 1 public library. It produced mustard oil, beedi, paddy.
