= Habibpur, Malda =

Habibpur
- Village
- Location in West Bengal, India Habibpur (India)
- Coordinates: 25.018418°N 88.285917°E
- Country: India
- State: West Bengal
- District: Malda

Population (2011)
  - Total: 2,576

Languages
  - Official: Bengali, English
- Time zone: UTC+5:30 (IST)
- PIN: 732122
- STD/ Telephone code: 03511
- Lok Sabha constituency: Maldaha Uttar
- Vidhan Sabha constituency: Habibpur
- Website: malda.nic.in

Habibpur is a village in the Habibpur CD block in the Malda Sadar subdivision of Malda district in the state of West Bengal, India. Habib ul rahman first person. Who built house first this village

== Geography ==
Cities, towns and locations in the northern portion of Malda district (including Chanchal subdivision and Old Malda, Habibpur, Bamangola and Gazole CD blocks)
M: municipal town, CT: census town, R: rural/ urban centre, F: Facility, H: historical centre
Owing to space constraints in the small map, the actual locations in a larger map may vary slightly

=== Location ===
Habibpur is located at 25.018418°N 88.285917°E.

=== Area overview ===
The area shown in the adjacent map covers two physiographic regions – the Barind in the east and the tal in the west. The eastern part is comparatively high (up to 40 metres above mean sea level at places) and uneven. The soils of the eastern region are "hard salty clays of a reddish hue and the ground is baked hard as iron." It lies to the east of the Mahananda River. The area lying to the west of the Mahananda River, the tal, is a flat low land and "is strewn with innumerable marshes, bils and oxbow lakes." The tal area is prone to flooding by local rivers. The total area is overwhelmingly rural. There are two important historical/ archaeological sites in the area – Pandua and Jagjivanpur.

Note: The map alongside presents some of the notable locations in the area. All places marked in the map are linked in the larger full screen map.

== Civic administration ==
=== Police station ===
Habibpur police station under West Bengal police has jurisdiction over Habibpur CD block.

=== CD block HQ ===
The headquarters of Habibpur CD block is at Habibpur.

== Demographics ==
As per the 2011 Census of India, Habibpur had a total population of 2,576, of which 1,276 (50%) were males and 1,300 (50%) were females. Population below 6 years was 327. The total number of literates in Habibpur was 1,327 (59.00% of the population over 6 years).

== Transport ==
Local roads passing through Kachu Pukur and Aiho link Habibpur to National Highway 12 (old number NH 34) at Malda.
