= Momtazuddin Ahmed (dramatist) =

Bangladeshi playwright and scholar

- মমতাজউদ্দীন আহমদ
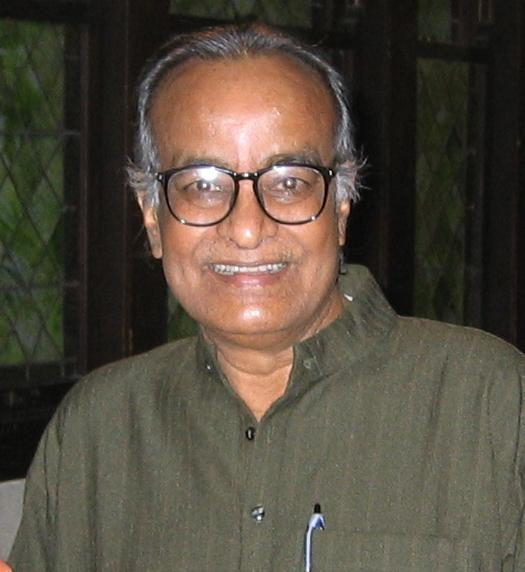
- Ahmed in Illinois during Tagore Festival (2006)
- Born: 18 January 1935; Habibpur, Malda, Bengal Presidency, British India (Now in West Bengal, India)
- Died: 2 June 2019 (aged 84); Evercare Hospital Dhaka, Bangladesh
- Education: MA (Bengali)
- Occupations: Educationist, Dramatist
- Spouse: Quamrunnessa Begum Kumu
- Children: 2 daughters and 2 sons
- Writing career
- Genres: drama, essay, short story, screenplay
- Notable work: Shadhinota Amar Shadhinota (বাংলা): স্বাধীনতা আমার স্বাধীনতা Saat Ghater Kanakori (বাংলা):সাত ঘাটের কানাকড়ি Ki Chaho Shankhachil (বাংলা): কি চাহ শঙ্খচিল
- Notable awards: Bangla Academy Literary Award (1976); Ekushey Padak (1997)

Momtazuddin Ahmed (18 January 1935 – 2 June 2019) was a Bangladeshi playwright-actor and educationist. He was also active in the field of culture, performance, literature and other socio-political activities. His theatre activities were mostly in the field of satire.

== Career ==
Ahmed taught Bengali, Sanskrit, and European drama in several non-government and government colleges for over 32 years. He served as a professor in the department of Bengali, at Jagannath University and a part-time lecturer at the department of Music and Dramatics, at the University of Dhaka.

Ahmed was involved in teaching, writing and acting in his career. He was an activist at the Bengali language movement.

Rabindra Bharati University included his writings Raja Onushwarer Pala and Ki Chaho Shankhachil in its curriculum. Ahmed was in charge of formulating the national curriculum and text books from 1976 to 1978.

Ahmed was a director of the Department of Research and Publications at Bangladesh Shilpakala Academy during 1977–1980. Later, he served the Bangladesh Permanent Mission to the United Nations as cultural minister.

Ahmed died on 2 June 2019 in Dhaka at the age of 84. He was buried at his ancestral home at Bholahat Upazila in Chapai Nawabganj District.

== Work ==
Ahmed wrote 25 plays for stage, radio and television and directed several of them. Most of his directions and writings were for his theatre troupe Theatre (Natok Shoroni).

- Ami
- Lalu Shalu Ebong Syed Waliullah
- Ki Chaho Shankhachil
- Raja Anushwarer Pala

Plays

- Shadhinota Amar Shadhinota
- Bokulporer Shadhinota
- Shaat Ghater Kana Kori
- Ohey Tanchak (an adaptation of a Molière satire)
- Khamakha Khamakha (an adaptation of a Shakespeare comedy)
- Barnochora

Others

- Jamidar Darpan (a re-writing of Mir Mosharraf Hossain's play)

== Awards ==
- Bangla Academy Literary Award (1976)
- Ekushey Padak (1997)
- Bangladesh Shilpakala Academy honored him as one of the outstanding playwrights in Bangladesh (2008)
- Alaol Literary Award
