= Gazole Town =

Gazole
- Town
- Location in West Bengal, India
- Coordinates: 25.2204800°N 88.1892700°E
- Country: India
- State: West Bengal
- District: Malda
- Railway Station: Gazole (GZO)

Government
  - Type: Block
  - Body: Gazole Block

Area
  - Total: 5.6721 km^{2} (2.1900 sq mi)

Population (2011)
  - Total: 49,618
  - Density: 8,747.7/km^{2} (22,657/sq mi)

Languages
  - Official: Bengali
  - Additional official: English
- Time zone: UTC+5:30 (IST)
- Postal code: 732124
- Lok Sabha constituency: Maldaha Uttar
- Vidhan Sabha constituency: Gazole
- Website: gajolnewtown.webs.com

Gazole (also spelled as Gajol) is a town in Malda district in the Indian state of West Bengal. Gazole police station serves this city. The headquarters of Gazole (community development block) block is Gazole.

== Geography ==
Cities, towns and locations in the northern portion of Malda district (including Chanchal subdivision and Old Malda, Habibpur, Bamangola and Gazole CD blocks)
M: municipal town, CT: census town, R: rural/ urban centre, F: Facility, H: historical centre
Owing to space constraints in the small map, the actual locations in a larger map may vary slightly

=== Location ===
Gazole town is located at 25°13′14″N 88°11′21″E.

The town declared as a municipality and the town consistent of the following villages - Bandhail, Bujruk bandhail, Garail, Gajol, Kadubari and Rangabhita. Gazole town has an area of 5. 6721 km^{2} (approx).

There is an announcement that Chanchal and Gazole would be amongst the 22 new municipalities to be formed in West Bengal. The matter has also been reported in the press, but till October 2018, there has been no formal announcement/ notification.

=== Area overview ===
The area shown in the adjacent map covers two physiographic regions – the Barind in the east and the tal in the west. The eastern part is comparatively high (up to 40 metres above mean sea level at places) and uneven. The soils of the eastern region are “hard salty clays of a reddish hue and the ground is baked hard as iron.” It lies to the east of the Mahananda River. The area lying to the west of the Mahananda River, the tal, is a flat low land and “is strewn with innumerable marshes, bils and oxbow lakes.” The tal area is prone to flooding by local rivers. The total area is overwhelmingly rural. There are two important historical/ archaeological sites in the area – Pandua and Jagjivanpur.

Note: The map alongside presents some of the notable locations in the area. All places marked in the map are linked in the larger full screen map.

== Civic administration ==
=== Police station ===
Gazole police station under West Bengal police has jurisdiction over Gazole CD block.

=== CD block HQ ===
The headquarters of Gazole CD block is at Gazole.

== Demographics ==
According to the 2011 Indian Census, Gazole had a total population of 4,626, of which 2,320 were males and 2,306 were females. Population within the age group of 0 to 6 years was 469. The total number of literate persons in Gazole was 3,523, which constituted 76.2% of the population with male literacy of 81.1% and female literacy of 71.2%. The effective literacy rate of 7+ population of Gazole was 84.7%, of which male literacy rate was 89.7% and female literacy rate was 79.7%. The Scheduled Castes and Scheduled Tribes population was 949 and 393 respectively. Gazole had 1098 households in 2011.

== Education ==
- Gazole Mahavidyalaya

== Healthcare ==
Gazole Rural Hospital at Gazole (with 30 beds) is the main medical facility in Gazole CD Block. Hatimari Rural Hospital at Hatimari (with 30 beds) is another major rural facility. There are primary health centres at Babupur (with 4 beds), Kutubshahar (Pandua PHC) (with 10 beds) and Purba Ranipur (Ranipur PHC) (with 10 beds).

== See also ==
- Gazole railway station
- Gazole (community development block)
- Gazole (Vidhan Sabha constituency)
