= Bulbulchandi =

- Village
- Location in West Bengal, India Bulbulchandi (India)
- Coordinates: 24.9843°N 88.2452°E
- Country: India
- State: West Bengal
- District: Malda

Population (2011)
  - Total: 2,915

Languages
  - Official: Bengali, English
- Time zone: UTC+5:30 (IST)
- PIN: 732122
- Telephone/ STD code: 03511
- Vehicle registration: WB
- Lok Sabha constituency: Maldaha Uttar
- Vidhan Sabha constituency: Maldaha
- Website: malda.nic.in

Bulbulchandi is a village and a gram panchayat in the Habibpur CD block in the Malda Sadar subdivision of Malda district in the state of West Bengal, India.

== Geography ==
Cities, towns and locations in the northern portion of Malda district (including Chanchal subdivision and Old Malda, Habibpur, Bamangola and Gazole CD blocks)
M: municipal town, CT: census town, R: rural/ urban centre, F: Facility, H: historical centre
Owing to space constraints in the small map, the actual locations in a larger map may vary slightly

=== Location ===
Bulbulchandi is located at 24.9843°N 88.2452°E.

=== Area overview ===
The area shown in the adjacent map covers two physiographic regions – the Barind in the east and the tal in the west. The eastern part is comparatively high (up to 40 metres above mean sea level at places) and uneven. The soils of the eastern region are "hard salty clays of a reddish hue and the ground is baked hard as iron." It lies to the east of the Mahananda River. The area lying to the west of the Mahananda River, the tal, is a flat low land and "is strewn with innumerable marshes, bils and oxbow lakes." The tal area is prone to flooding by local rivers. The total area is overwhelmingly rural. There are two important historical/ archaeological sites in the area – Pandua and Jagjivanpur.

Note: The map alongside presents some of the notable locations in the area. All places marked in the map are linked in the larger full screen map.

== Demographics ==
According to the 2011 Census of India, Bulbulchandi had a total population of 2,915, of which 1,493 (51%) were males and 1,422 (49%) were females. Population in the age range 0–6 years was 292. The total number of literate persons in Bulbulchandi was 6,524 (79.34% of the population over 6 years).

== Transport ==
There is a station at Bulbulchandi on the Howrah-New Jalpaiguri line. It is 15 km from Old Malda Junction railway station.

== Healthcare ==
R.N.Roy Rural Hospital, with 30 beds, at Bulbulchandi is a major government facility in Habibpur CD block.
