= Bamangola =

Bamangola Bamangram
- Village
- Location in West Bengal, India Bamangola (India)
- Coordinates: 25.1687°N 88.3351°E
- Country: India
- State: West Bengal
- District: Malda

Population (2011)
  - Total: 2,994=

Languages
  - Official: Bengali, English
- Time zone: UTC+5:30 (IST)
- PIN: 732147
- STD/ Telephone code: 03511
- Lok Sabha constituency: Maldaha Uttar
- Vidhan Sabha constituency: Habibpur
- Website: malda.nic.in

Bamangola is a village in Bamangola CD Block in Malda Sadar subdivision of Malda district in the state of West Bengal, India.

== Geography ==
=== Location ===
Bamanagola is located at 25.1687°N 88.3351°E.

As per the Map of Bamangola block in the District Census Handbook, Malda, Bamangola is a part of Bamangram, a village.

Tangon River flows past Bamangola.

=== Police station ===
Bamangola police station under West Bengal police has jurisdiction over Bamangola CD Block.

== Demographics ==
As per the 2011 Census of India, Bamungram had a total population of 2,994, of which 1,534 (51%) were males and 1,459 (49%) were females. Population below 6 years was 307. The total number of literates in Bamungram was 1,878 (69.89% of the population over 6 years).

== Transport ==
Bamangola Road and Nalagola-Pakuahat-Malda Road link it to National Highway 12 at Malda on one side, and on the other Gazole-Bamangola Road links it to NH 12 at Gazole.

== Education ==
Bamangola High School, founded in 1938, is a Bengali-medium co-educational higher secondary school, with facilities for teaching from Class VI to Class XII. It is housed in a government building, has 2,577 books in the library and has a playground etc.
