= Old Malda (community development block) =

- Community development block
- Interactive map of Old Malda
- Coordinates: 25.0563600°N 88.2117600°E
- Country: India
- State: West Bengal
- District: Malda

Government
  - Type: Representative democracy
  - Body: BDO (SK MD ERFAN HABIB, WBCS EXE.)

Area
  - Total: 228 km^{2} (88 sq mi)

Population (2011)
  - Total: 156,365
  - Density: 686/km^{2} (1,780/sq mi)

Languages
  - Official: Bengali, English
- Time zone: UTC+5:30 (IST)
- PIN: 732128, 732141, 732142
- STD/telephone code: 03512
- Lok Sabha constituency: Maldaha Uttar
- Vidhan Sabha constituency: Maldaha
- Website: malda.nic.in

Old Malda is a community development block that forms an administrative division in Malda Sadar subdivision of Malda district in the Indian state of West Bengal.

== History ==
=== Gauda and Pandua ===
Gauda was once the "capital of the ancient bhukti or political division of Bengal known as Pundravardhana which lay on the eastern extremity of the Gupta Empire." During the rule of the Sena Dynasty, in the 11th-12th century, Gauda was rebuilt and extended as Lakshmanawati (later Lakhnauti), and it became the hub of the Sena empire. Gauda was conquered by Muhammad bin Bakhtiyar Khalji in 1205. During the Turko-Afghan period, "the city of Lakhnauti or Gauda continued to function initially as their capital but was abandoned in 1342 by the Ilyas Shahi sultans in favour of Pandua because of major disturbances along the river course of the Ganga." "Pandua then lay on the banks of the Mahananda, which was the major waterway of the sultanate at the time. However, when the Mahananda too began to veer away from the site of Pandua in the mid-15th century, Gauda was rebuilt and restored to the status of capital city by the Hussain Shahi sultans"... With the ascent of Akbar to the Mughal throne at Delhi... the Mughals annexed the ancient region of Gauda in 1576 and created the Diwani of Bengal. The centre of regional power shifted across the Ganga to Rajmahal. Following the demise of the independent sultanate, the regional importance of the Gauda or Malda region declined irreversibly and the city of Gauda was eventually abandoned.

=== Malda district ===
With the advent of the British, their trading and commercial interests focused on the new cities of Malda and English Bazar. Malda district was formed in 1813 with "some portion of outlying areas of Purnia, Dinajpur and Rajshahi districts". A separate treasury was established in 1832 and a full-fledged Magistrate and Collector was posted in 1859. Malda district was part of Rajshahi Division till 1876, when it was transferred to Bhagalpur Division, and again transferred in 1905 to Rajshahi Division. With the partition of Bengal in 1947, the Radcliffe Line placed Malda district in India, except the Nawabganj subdivision, which was placed in East Pakistan.

== Geography ==
Jatradanga, a constituent panchayat of Old Malda community development block, is located at 25.0563600°N 88.2117600°E.

Old Malda CD Block is a part of the Barind Tract, one of the three physiographic subregions of the district that goes beyond the boundaries of the district. "This region is made up of the ancient alluvial humps that are remnants of old riverine flood plains that remained unaffected subsequently by inundation and renewed silting." It forms an upland slightly higher than the surrounding areas. Old Malda and Gazole CD Blocks form the Mahananda-Tangon interfluves area. Barind soils permit little percolation and most of the monsoon runoff accumulates in the large natural bils (ponds) in the ravines formed by the courses of the Tangon and Punarbhaba rivers, covering the lowlands.

Old Malda CD Block is bounded by Gazole CD Block in the north, Habibpur CD Block in the east, Bholahat Upazila of Chapai Nawabganj District, Bangladesh, on the south, and English Bazar CD Block and Ratua II CD Block on the west.

Old Malda CD Block has an area of 228.00 km^{2}. It has 1 panchayat samity, 6 gram panchayats, 97 gram sansads (village councils), 118 mouzas and 112 inhabited villages. Malda police station serves this block. Headquarters of this CD Block is at Narayanpur.

165.5 km of the India-Bangladesh border is in Malda district. CD Blocks on the border are Bamangola, Habibpur, Old Malda, English Bazar and Kaliachak-III.

Gram panchayats of Old Malda block/ panchayat samiti are: Mahishbathani, Bhabuk, Jatradanga, Mangalbari, Sahapur and Muchia.

== Demographics ==
=== Population ===
As per 2011 Census of India, Old Malda CD Block had a total population of 156,365, of which 135,855 were rural and 20,510 were urban. There were 80,108 (51%) males and 76,257 (49%) females. Population below 6 years was 21,123. Scheduled Castes numbered 50,287 (32.16%) and Scheduled Tribes numbered 23,536 (15.05%).

Census towns in Old Malda CD Block were (2011 population in brackets): Jhangra (5,022), Chhatinamor (5,582) and Sahapur (9,906).

Large villages (with 4,000+ population) in Old Malda CD Block were (2011 population in brackets): Balarampur (4,119), Mahish Bathani (5,433), Kaluari (7,024), Morgram (4,786), Aradpur (4,174), Mabarakpur (9,842) and Muchia (5,241).

Other villages in Old Malda CD Block included (2011 population in brackets): Jatradanga (3,740) and Bhabuk (728).

Decadal Population Growth Rate (%)

View source data.

Note: The CD Block data for 1971-1981, 1981-1991 and 1991-2001 is for Old Malda PS

The decadal growth of population in Old Malda CD Block in 2001-2011 was 19.13%. The decadal growth of population in Old Malda PS covering Old Malda CD Block in 1991-2001 was -1.31%. The decadal growth of population in Old Malda PS in 1981-91 was 47.84% and in 1971-81 was 38.96%. The decadal growth rate of population in Malda district was as follows: 30.33% in 1951-61, 31.98% in 1961-71, 26.00% in 1971-81, 29.78% in 1981-91, 24.78% in 1991-2001 and 21.22% in 2001-11. The decadal growth rate for West Bengal in 2001-11 was 13.93%. The decadal growth rate for West Bengal was 13.93 in 2001-2011, 17.77% in 1991-2001. 24.73% in 1981-1991 and 23.17% in 1971-1981.

Malda district has the second highest decadal population growth rate, for the decade 2001-2011, in West Bengal with a figure of 21.2% which is much higher than the state average (13.8%). Uttar Dinajpur district has the highest decadal growth rate in the state with 23.2%. Decadal growth rate of population is higher than that of neighbouring Murshidabad district, which has the next highest growth rate.

As per the Refugee Relief and Rehabilitation Department of the Government of West Bengal and 1971 census, only 1.7% of around 6 million refugees who had come in from erstwhile East Pakistan, were resettled in Malda district. The Barind tract was opened for refugee resettlement in the aftermath of the partition.

Population density in the district has intensified from 162 persons per km^{2} in 1901 to 881 in 2001 (i.e., around five times), which is highest amongst the districts of North Bengal. However, unlike the densely populated southern regions of West Bengal, urbanisation remains low in Malda district. North Bengal in general, and Malda in particular, has been witness to large scale population movement from other states in India and other districts of West Bengal, as well as from outside the country. The District Human Development Report for Malda notes, "Malda district has been a principal recipient of the human migration waves of the 20th century."

There are reports of Bangladeshi infiltrators coming through the international border. Only a small portion of the border with Bangladesh has been fenced and it is popularly referred to as a porous border.

=== Literacy ===
As per the 2011 census, the total number of literates in Old Malda CD Block was 80,614 (59.61% of the population over 6 years) out of which males numbered 45,278 (65.35% of the male population over 6 years) and females numbered 35,336 (53.66% of the female population over 6 years). The gender disparity (the difference between female and male literacy rates) was 11.58%.

See also – List of West Bengal districts ranked by literacy rate

Literacy in CD blocks of
Malda district
Malda Sadar subdivision
Gazole – 63.07%
Bamangola – 68.09%
Habibpur – 58.81%
Old Malda – 59.61%
English Bazar – 63.03%
Manikchak – 57.77%
Kaliachak I – 65.25%
Kaliachak II – 64.89%
Kaliachak III – 54.16%
Chanchal subdivision
Harishchandrapur I – 52.47%
Harishchandrapur II – 54.34%
Chanchal I – 65.09%
Chanchal II – 57.38%
Ratua I – 60.13%
Ratua II – 56.19%
Source: 2011 Census: CD Block Wise
Primary Census Abstract Data

=== Language and religion ===
Religion in Old Malda CD block (2011)
Hinduism	70.00%
Islam	28.60%
Christianity	0.79%
Other or not stated	0.61%

Hinduism is the majority religion, with 70.00% of the population. Islam is the second-largest religion.

As per 2014 District Statistical Handbook: Malda (quoting census figures), in the 2001 census, Hindus numbered 93,521 and formed 71.25% of the population in Old Malda CD Block. Muslims numbered 34,605 and formed 26.36% of the population. Christians numbered 801 and formed 0.61% of the population. Others numbered 2,838 and formed 1.78% of the population.

Languages of Old Malda CD block (2011)
1. Bengali (83.4%)
2. Santali (12.6%)
3. Hindi (1.58%)
4. Others (2.44%)

At the time of the 2011 census, 83.39% of the population spoke Bengali, 12.59% Santali and 1.58% Hindi as their first language.

== Rural poverty ==
As per the Human Development Report for Malda district, published in 2006, the percentage of rural families in BPL category in Old Malda CD Block was 39.2%. Official surveys have found households living in absolute poverty in Malda district to be around 39%.

According to the report, "An overwhelmingly large segment of the rural workforce depends on agriculture as its main source of livelihood, the extent of landlessness in Malda has traditionally been high because of the high densities of human settlement in the district… Although land reforms were implemented in Malda district from the time they were launched in other parts of West Bengal, their progress has been uneven across the Malda blocks… because of the overall paucity of land, the extent of ceiling-surplus land available for redistribution has never been large… The high levels of rural poverty that exist in nearly all blocks in Malda district closely reflect the livelihood crisis… "

== Economy ==
=== Livelihood ===
Livelihood
in Old Malda CD Block
1. Cultivators (19.5%)
2. Agricultural labourers (38.0%)
3. Household industries (3.92%)
4. Other Workers (38.6%)

In Old Malda CD Block in 2011, amongst the class of total workers, cultivators numbered 10,182 and formed 19.46%, agricultural labourers numbered 23,991 and formed 38.01%, household industry workers numbered 2,473 and formed 3.92% and other workers numbered 24,379 and formed 38.62%. Total workers numbered 63,124 and formed 40.37% of the total population, and non-workers numbered 93,241 and formed 59.63% of the population.

Note: In the census records a person is considered a cultivator, if the person is engaged in cultivation/ supervision of land owned by self/government/institution. When a person who works on another person's land for wages in cash or kind or share, is regarded as an agricultural labourer. Household industry is defined as an industry conducted by one or more members of the family within the household or village, and one that does not qualify for registration as a factory under the Factories Act. Other workers are persons engaged in some economic activity other than cultivators, agricultural labourers and household workers. It includes factory, mining, plantation, transport and office workers, those engaged in business and commerce, teachers, entertainment artistes and so on.

=== Infrastructure ===
There are 112 inhabited villages in Old Malda CD Block. All 112 villages (100%) have power supply. All 112 villages (100%) have drinking water supply. 11 villages (9.82%) have post offices. 101 villages (90.18%) have telephones (including landlines, public call offices and mobile phones). 27 villages (24.11%) have a pucca (paved) approach road and 19 villages (16.96%) have transport communication (includes bus service, rail facility and navigable waterways). 3 villages (2.68%) have agricultural credit societies. 2 villages (1.79%) have banks.

=== Agriculture ===
The upland regions in the Barind area are mono-cropped because of limitations regarding the use of tube wells here.

Old Malda CD Block had 71 fertiliser depots, 7 seed stores and 26 fair price shops in 2013-14.

In 2013-14, Old Malda CD Block produced 2,769 tonnes of Aman paddy, the main winter crop from 1,201 hectares, 14,733 tonnes of Boro paddy (spring crop) from 3,751 hectares, 1,370 tonnes of Aus paddy (summer crop) from 705 hectares, 1,040 tonnes of wheat from 369 hectares, 737 tonnes of maize from 189 hectares, 3,524 tonnes of jute from 210 hectares, 39,148 tonnes of potatoes from 1,210 hectares and 2,969 tonnes of sugar cane from 29 hectares. It also produced pulses and oilseeds.

In 2013-14, the total area irrigated in Old Malda CD Block was 6,172 hectares, out of which 252 hectares were irrigated by tank irrigation, 1,133 hectares by river lift irrigation, 948 hectares by deep tube wells, 2,310 hectares by shallow tube wells and 1,529 hectares by other means.

=== Mango ===
25,500 hectares of land in Malda district produces mango varieties such as langra, himasagar, amrapali, laxmanbhog, gopalbhog and fazli. The core area of mango production is Old Malda, English Bazar and Manikchak CD Blocks, from where it has spread to Kaliachak I & II, Ratua I & II and Chanchal I CD Blocks.

=== Backward Regions Grant Fund ===
Malda district is listed as a backward region and receives financial support from the Backward Regions Grant Fund. The fund, created by the Government of India, is designed to redress regional imbalances in development. As of 2012, 272 districts across the country were listed under this scheme. The list includes 11 districts of West Bengal.

== Transport ==
In 2013-14, Old Malda CD Block had 1 ferry services and 4 originating/ terminating bus routes.

There is a station at Old Malda on the Howrah–New Jalpaiguri line.

There is a station at Malda Court on the railway track from Old Malda to Singhabad.

National Highway 12 (old number 34) passes through Old Malda CD Block.

== Education ==
In 2013-14, Old Malda CD Block had 103 primary schools with 13,007 students, 12 middle schools with 2,043 students, 4 high schools with 3,611 students and 6 higher secondary schools with 11,627 students. Old Malda CD Block had 308 institutions for special and non-formal education with 12,241 students.

As per the 2011 census, in Old Malda CD Block, amongst the 112 inhabited villages, 24 villages did not have a school, 64 villages had more than 1 primary school, 24 villages had at least 1 primary and 1 middle school and 11 villages had at least 1 middle and 1 secondary school.

== Healthcare ==
In 2014, Old Malda CD Block had 1 rural hospital, 2 primary health centres, 3 central government/PSU medical units and 1 nursing home with total 105 beds and 7 doctors (excluding private bodies). It had 25 family welfare subcentres. 1,857 patients were treated indoor and 148,149 patients were treated outdoor in the hospitals, health centres and subcentres of the CD Block.

Moulpur Rural Hospital at Old Malda (with 30 beds) is the main medical facility in Old Malda CD Block. There are primary health centres at Jatradanga (with 6 beds) and Mahadevpur (Muchia PHC) (with 10 beds).
