= Gazole (community development block) =

- Community development block
- Interactive map of Gazole
- Coordinates: 25.2204800°N 88.1892700°E
- Country: India
- State: West Bengal
- District: Malda

Government
  - Type: Representative democracy

Area
  - Total: 513.73 km^{2} (198.35 sq mi)

Population (2011)
  - Total: 343,830
  - Density: 669.28/km^{2} (1,733.4/sq mi)

Languages
  - Official: Bengali, English
- Time zone: UTC+5:30 (IST)
- PIN: 732124
- STD/telephone code: 03512
- ISO 3166 code: IN-WB
- Lok Sabha constituency: Maldaha Uttar
- Vidhan Sabha constituency: Gazole
- Website: malda.nic.in

Gazole (also spelled Gajol) is a community development block that forms an administrative division in Malda Sadar subdivision of Malda district in the Indian state of West Bengal.

== History ==
=== Gauda and Pandua ===
Gauda was once the “capital of the ancient bhukti or political division of Bengal known as Pundravardhana which lay on the eastern extremity of the Gupta Empire.” During the rule of the Sena Dynasty, in the 11th-12th century, Gauda was rebuilt and extended as Lakshmanawati (later Lakhnauti), and it became the hub of the Sena empire. Gauda was conquered by Muhammad bin Bakhtiyar Khalji in 1205. During the Turko-Afghan period, “the city of Lakhnauti or Gauda continued to function initially as their capital but was abandoned in 1342 by the Ilyas Shahi sultans in favour of Pandua because of major disturbances along the river course of the Ganga.” “Pandua then lay on the banks of the Mahananda, which was the major waterway of the sultanate at the time. However, when the Mahananda too began to veer away from the site of Pandua in the mid-15th century, Gauda was rebuilt and restored to the status of capital city by the Hussain Shahi sultans”… With the ascent of Akbar to the Mughal throne at Delhi… the Mughals annexed the ancient region of Gauda in 1576 and created the Diwani of Bengal. The centre of regional power shifted across the Ganga to Rajmahal. Following the demise of the independent sultanate, the regional importance of the Gauda or Malda region declined irreversibly and the city of Gauda was eventually abandoned.

=== Malda district ===
With the advent of the British, their trading and commercial interests focused on the new cities of Malda and English Bazar. Malda district was formed in 1813 with “some portion of outlying areas of Purnia, Dinajpur and Rajshahi districts”. A separate treasury was established in 1832 and a full-fledged Magistrate and Collector was posted in 1859. Malda district was part of Rajshahi Division till 1876, when it was transferred to Bhagalpur Division, and again transferred in 1905 to Rajshahi Division. With the partition of Bengal in 1947, the Radcliffe Line placed Malda district in India, except the Nawabganj subdivision, which was placed in East Pakistan.

== Geography ==
Gazole is located at 25.2204800°N 88.1892700°E.

The ruins of the historic city Pandua are located in Gazole block and also naturally growing a forest which called Adina Forest (now it is a Deer Park namely Adina Deer Park).

Gazole CD Block is a part of the Barind Tract, one of the three physiographic subregions of the district that goes beyond the boundaries of the district. “This region is made up of the ancient alluvial humps that are remnants of old riverine flood plains that remained unaffected subsequently by inundation and renewed silting.” It forms an upland slightly higher than the surrounding areas. Old Malda and Gazole CD Blocks form the Mahananda-Tangon interfluves area. Barind soils permit little percolation and most of the monsoon runoff accumulates in the large natural bils (ponds) in the ravines formed by the courses of the Tangon and Punarbhaba rivers, covering the lowlands.

Gazole CD Block is bounded by Itahar CD Block of Uttar Dinajpur district, Harirampur and Bansihari CD Blocks of Dakshin Dinajpur district on the north, Bamangola CD Block on the east, Habibpur and Old Malda CD Blocks on the south and Ratua II CD Block on the west.

Gazole CD Block has an area of 513.73 km^{2}. It has 1 panchayat samity, 15 gram panchayats, 220 gram sansads (village councils), 293 mouzas and 286 inhabited villages. Gazole police station serves this block. Headquarters of this CD Block is at Gazole.

Gazole is an intermediate panchayat in Malda district. The village panchayats under it are: Alal, Babupur, Bairagachi I & II, Chaknagar, Deotala, Gazole I & II, Karkach, Majhra, Pandua, Raniganj I & II, Sahajadpur and Salaidanga.

== Demographics ==
=== Population ===
As per 2011 Census of India, Gazole CD Block had a total population of 343,830, of which 332,191 were rural and 11,639 were urban. There were 174,536 (51%) males and 169,294 (49%) females. Population below 6 years was 44,134. Scheduled Castes numbered 128,464 (37.36%) and Scheduled Tribes numbered 68,548 (19.94%).

There are two census towns in Gazole CD Block was (2011 population in brackets): Bandhail (6,175) and Rangabhita (5,464).

Large villages (with 4,000+ population) in Gazole CD Block were (2011 population in brackets): Rajaram Chak (5,379), Saharol (4,365), Arazi Deharul (5,934), Bahirgachhi (8,014), Alinagar (4,895), Kutub Sahar (6,807), Mishipur (5,105), Adina (6,581), Barijpur (4,652), Saidpur (4,561), Gajol (4,626), Garail (4,251), Bade Mayna (6,452), Deotala (4,916), Duba Khoksan (4,475), Raniganj (4,880) and Arazi Jalsa (4,085).

Other villages in Gazole CD Block included (2011 population in brackets): Alal (2,050), Kakrach (651), Babupur (2,709), Chak Nagar (1,998), Sahazadpur (1,275), Salaidanga (1,427), Majhra (797) and Pandua (1,911).

Decadal Population Growth Rate (%)

Note: The CD Block data for 1971-1981, 1981-1991 and 1991-2001 is for Gazole PS

The decadal growth of population in Gazole CD Block in 2001-2011 was 16.67%. The decadal growth of population in Gazole PS covering Gazole CD Block in 1991-2001 was 26.41%. The decadal growth of population in Gazole PS in 1981-91 was 29.30% and in 1971-81 was 25.72%. The decadal growth rate of population in Malda district was as follows: 30.33% in 1951-61, 31.98% in 1961-71, 26.00% in 1971-81, 29.78% in 1981-91, 24.78% in 1991-2001 and 21.22% in 2001-11. The decadal growth rate for West Bengal in 2001-11 was 13.93%. The decadal growth rate for West Bengal was 13.93 in 2001-2011, 17.77% in 1991-2001. 24.73% in 1981-1991 and 23.17% in 1971-1981.

Malda district has the second highest decadal population growth rate, for the decade 2001-2011, in West Bengal with a figure of 21.2% which is much higher than the state average (13.8%). Uttar Dinajpur district has the highest decadal growth rate in the state with 23.2%. Decadal growth rate of population is higher than that of neighbouring Murshidabad district, which has the next highest growth rate.

As per the Refugee Relief and Rehabilitation Department of the Government of West Bengal and 1971 census, only 1.7% of around 6 million refugees who had come in from erstwhile East Pakistan, were resettled in Malda district. The Barind tract was opened for refugee resettlement in the aftermath of the partition.

Population density in the district has intensified from 162 persons per km^{2} in 1901 to 881 in 2001 (i.e., around five times), which is highest amongst the districts of North Bengal. However, unlike the densely populated southern regions of West Bengal, urbanisation remains low in Malda district. North Bengal in general, and Malda in particular, has been witness to large scale population movement from other states in India and other districts of West Bengal, as well as from outside the country. The District Human Development Report for Malda notes, “Malda district has been a principal recipient of the human migration waves of the 20th century.”

There are reports of Bangladeshi infiltrators coming through the international border. Only a small portion of the border with Bangladesh has been fenced and it is popularly referred to as a porous border.

GP Wise population of Gazole Block (2011 Census)

GP	Male	Female	Total
Alal	17482	16762	34244
Karkach	12141	11532	23673
Deotola	10820	10371	21191
Babupur	6776	6762	13538
Salaidanga	14676	14253	28929
Gazole I	15703	15473	31176
Gazole II	9208	9234	18442
Sahajadpur	11806	11672	23478
Chaknagar	8990	8650	17640
Bairgachi I	6457	6302	12759
Bairgachi II	11853	11555	23408
Pandua	17849	17150	34999
Raniganj I	7526	7111	14637
Raniganj II	9673	9326	18999
Majhra	13576	13141	26717
Total	174536	169294	343830

=== Literacy ===
As per the 2011 census, the total number of literates in Gazole CD Block was 189,014 (63.07% of the population over 6 years) out of which males numbered 106,217 (69.79% of the male population over 6 years) and females numbered 82,797 (56.13% of the female population over 6 years). The gender disparity (the difference between female and male literacy rates) was 13.66%.

See also – List of West Bengal districts ranked by literacy rate

Literacy in CD blocks of
Malda district
Malda Sadar subdivision
Gazole – 63.07%
Bamangola – 68.09%
Habibpur – 58.81%
Old Malda – 59.61%
English Bazar – 63.03%
Manikchak – 57.77%
Kaliachak I – 65.25%
Kaliachak II – 64.89%
Kaliachak III – 54.16%
Chanchal subdivision
Harishchandrapur I – 52.47%
Harishchandrapur II – 54.34%
Chanchal I – 65.09%
Chanchal II – 57.38%
Ratua I – 60.13%
Ratua II – 56.19%
Source: 2011 Census: CD Block Wise
Primary Census Abstract Data

=== Language and religion ===
Religion in Gazole CD block (2011)
Hinduism	74.51%
Islam	23.60%
Hinduism	1.17%
Sarnaism	0.63%
Other or not stated	0.09%

Hinduism is the majority religion, with 74.51% of the population. Islam is the second-largest religion.

As per 2014 District Statistical Handbook: Malda (quoting census figures), in the 2001 census, Hindus numbered 222,610 and formed 75.53% of the population in Gazole CD Block. Muslims numbered 65,650 and formed 22.28% of the population. Christians numbered 2,883 and formed 0.98% of the population. Others numbered 3,572 and formed 1.21% of the population.

Languages of Gazole CD block (2011)
1. Bengali (80.1%)
2. Santali (16.5%)
3. Koda (0.92%)
4. Others (2.48%)

At the time of the 2011 census, 80.11% of the population spoke Bengali, 16.49% Santali and 0.92% Koda as their first language.

== Rural poverty ==
As per the Human Development Report for Malda district, published in 2006, the percentage of rural families in BPL category in Gazole CD Block was 46.5%. Official surveys have found households living in absolute poverty in Malda district to be around 39%.

According to the report, “An overwhelmingly large segment of the rural workforce depends on agriculture as its main source of livelihood, the extent of landlessness in Malda has traditionally been high because of the high densities of human settlement in the district… Although land reforms were implemented in Malda district from the time they were launched in other parts of West Bengal, their progress has been uneven across the Malda blocks… because of the overall paucity of land, the extent of ceiling-surplus land available for redistribution has never been large… The high levels of rural poverty that exist in nearly all blocks in Malda district closely reflect the livelihood crisis… “

== Economy ==
=== Livelihood ===
Livelihood
in Gazole CD Block
1. Cultivators (35.2%)
2. Agricultural labourers (39.7%)
3. Household industries (1.88%)
4. Other Workers (23.2%)

In Gazole CD Block in 2011, amongst the class of total workers, cultivators numbered 51,433 and formed 35.20%, agricultural labourers numbered 57,954 and formed 39.67%, household industry workers numbered 2,748 and formed 1.88% and other workers numbered 18,179 and formed 23.25%. Total workers numbered 146,048 and formed 42.49% of the total population, and non-workers numbered 197,732 and formed 57.31% of the population.

Note: In the census records a person is considered a cultivator, if the person is engaged in cultivation/ supervision of land owned by self/government/institution. When a person who works on another person’s land for wages in cash or kind or share, is regarded as an agricultural labourer. Household industry is defined as an industry conducted by one or more members of the family within the household or village, and one that does not qualify for registration as a factory under the Factories Act. Other workers are persons engaged in some economic activity other than cultivators, agricultural labourers and household workers. It includes factory, mining, plantation, transport and office workers, those engaged in business and commerce, teachers, entertainment artistes and so on.

=== Infrastructure ===
There are 286 inhabited villages in Gazole CD Block. All 286 villages (100%) have power supply. 285 villages (99.65%) have drinking water supply. 10 villages (3.5%) have post offices. 273 villages (95.45%) have telephones (including landlines, public call offices and mobile phones). 90 villages (31.47%) have a pucca approach road and 64 villages (22.38%) have transport communication (includes bus service, rail facility and navigable waterways). 10 villages (3.5%) have agricultural credit societies. 10 villages (3.5%) have banks.

=== Agriculture ===
The upland regions in the Barind area are mono-cropped because of limitations regarding the use of tube wells here.

Gazole CD Block had 194 fertiliser depots, 18 seed stores and 70 fair price shops in 2013-14.

In 2013-14, Gazole CD Block produced 97,935 tonnes of Aman paddy, the main winter crop from 29,577 hectares, 24,516 tonnes of Boro paddy (spring crop) from 5,995 hectares, 119 tonnes of Aus paddy (summer crop) from 61 hectares, 21,145 tonnes of wheat from 5,958 hectares, 65 tonnes of maize from 17 hectares, 5,948 tonnes of jute from 346 hectares, 10,517 tonnes of potatoes from 437 hectares and 102 tonnes of sugar cane from 1 hectare. It also produced pulses and oilseeds.

In 2013-14, the total area irrigated in Gazole CD Block was 13,911 hectares, out of which 450 hectares were irrigated by tank irrigation, 1,060 hectares by river lift irrigation, 793 hectares by deep tube wells, 8,049 hectares by shallow tube wells and 3,559 hectares by other means.

=== Backward Regions Grant Fund ===
Malda district is listed as a backward region and receives financial support from the Backward Regions Grant Fund. The fund, created by the Government of India, is designed to redress regional imbalances in development. As of 2012, 272 districts across the country were listed under this scheme. The list includes 11 districts of West Bengal.

== Transport ==
In 2013-14, Gazole CD Block had 8 ferry services and 9 originating/ terminating bus routes.

Eklakhi Junction railway station is on the Howrah–New Jalpaiguri line. The Eklakhi-Balurghat branch line links Eklakhi to Balurghat.

National Highway 12 (old number NH 34) and State Highway 10 cross at Gazole.

== Education ==
In 2013-14, Gazole CD Block had 219 primary schools with 24,283 students, 24 middle schools with 3,116 students, 17 high schools with 28,245 students and 17 higher secondary schools with 21,342 students. Gazole CD Block had 1 general degree college with 4,335 students, 3 technical/ professional institutions with 300 students and 936 institutions for special and non-formal education with 21,840 students.

As per the 2011 census, in Gazole CD Block, amongst the 286 inhabited villages, 62 villages did not have a school, 151 villages had more than 1 primary school, 73 villages had at least 1 primary and 1 middle school and 35 villages had at least 1 middle and 1 secondary school.

=== Colleges ===
- Gazole Mahavidyalaya
- Adarshabani Teacher's Training College
- Pandua Ideal Teacher's College
- North Malda Teachers' Education College
- David Hare Teacher's Training College
- Gazole College of Education

=== High schools ===
- Tiakati High School
- Pandua A.K. High School
- Gajol Haji Nakoo Mahammad High School
- Shyam Sukhi Balika Siksha Niketan
- Moyna High School
- Dharani Bhuban Shashi Vidyapith (H.S.)
- Hatimari High School
- Ram Chandra Saha Balika Vidyalaya
- Swechand Parameswari Vidyamandir
- Chandrabati Saha Vidyapith
- Tarikullah Sarkar High School
- Badnagra High School
- Raniganj Krishnachndra High School
- Mashaldighi Sibabrati Vidyapith
- Ahora Vivekananda Shikhaniketan
- Dubakhoksan Bairdangi K.R. High School
- Alal High School
- Madnahar Jr High School
- Babupur High School (H.S)
- Rajaramchak High Madrasha

== Healthcare ==
In 2014, Gazole CD Block had 2 rural hospitals and 3 primary health centres, with total 70 beds and 13 doctors (excluding private bodies). It had 60 family welfare subcentres. 3,955 patients were treated indoor and 252,694 patients were treated outdoor in the hospitals, health centres and subcentres of the CD Block.

Gazole Rural Hospital at Gazole (with 30 beds) is the main medical facility in Gazole CD Block. Hatimari Rural Hospital at Hatimari (with 30 beds) is another major rural facility. There are primary health centres at Babupur (with 4 beds), Kutubshahar (Pandua PHC) (with 10 beds) and Purba Ranipur (Ranipur PHC) (with 10 beds).
