= Bandhail =

- Census Town
- Location in West Bengal, India Bandhail (India)
- Coordinates: 25.21624°N 88.20123°E
- Country: India
- State: West Bengal
- District: Malda

Area
  - Total: 1.1888 km^{2} (0.4590 sq mi)

Population (2011)
  - Total: 6,175
  - Density: 5,194/km^{2} (13,450/sq mi)

Languages
  - Official: Bengali, English
- Time zone: UTC+5:30 (IST)
- PIN: 732124
- Telephone/ STD code: 03512
- Vehicle registration: WB
- Lok Sabha constituency: Maldaha Uttar
- Vidhan Sabha constituency: Gazole
- Website: malda.nic.in

Bandhail is a census town in the Gazole CD block in the Malda Sadar subdivision of Malda district in the state of West Bengal, India.

== Geography ==
Cities, towns and locations in the northern portion of Malda district (including Chanchal subdivision and Old Malda, Habibpur, Bamangola and Gazole CD blocks)
M: municipal town, CT: census town, R: rural/ urban centre, F: Facility, H: historical centre
Owing to space constraints in the small map, the actual locations in a larger map may vary slightly

=== Location ===
Bandhail is located at 25.21624°N 88.20123°E.

=== Area overview ===
The area shown in the adjacent map covers two physiographic regions – the Barind in the east and the tal in the west. The eastern part is comparatively high (up to 40 metres above mean sea level at places) and uneven. The soils of the eastern region are "hard salty clays of a reddish hue and the ground is baked hard as iron." It lies to the east of the Mahananda River. The area lying to the west of the Mahananda River, the tal, is a flat low land and "is strewn with innumerable marshes, bils and oxbow lakes." The tal area is prone to flooding by local rivers. The total area is overwhelmingly rural. There are two important historical/ archaeological sites in the area – Pandua and Jagjivanpur.

Note: The map alongside presents some of the notable locations in the area. All places marked in the map are linked in the larger full screen map.

== Demographics ==
According to the 2011 Census of India, Bandhail had a total population of 6,175, of which 3,159 (51%) were males and 3,016 (49%) were females. Population in the age range 0–6 years was 639. The total number of literate persons in Bandhail was 4,940 (89.23% of the population over 6 years).

== Infrastructure ==
According to the District Census Handbook, Maldah, 2011, Bandhail covered an area of 1.1888 km^{2}. It had 6 km roads with both open and closed drains. The protected water-supply involved overhead tank, tap water from untreated sources, hand pump. It had 1,400 domestic electric connections, 150 road lighting points. Among the medical facilities it had 1 family welfare centre, 1 maternity & child welfare centre, 10 medicine shops. Among the educational facilities, it had 3 primary schools, 1 middle school, 1 secondary school, 1 higher secondary school, 1 general degree college at Kotalhati 2 km away. It had 1 non-formal education centre (Sarva Shiksha Abhiyan). Among the social, cultural and recreational facilities it had 1 cinema theatre, 1 auditorium/ community hall, 1 public library, 1 reading room. It produced rice and flour. It had the branch offices of 2 nationalised banks, 2 private commercial banks, 1 cooperative bank, 1 agricultural credit society, 1 non-agricultural credit society.
