= Habibpur (community development block) =

- Community development block
- Interactive map of Habibpur
- Coordinates: 25.0184177°N 88.3589172°E
- Country: India
- State: West Bengal
- District: Malda

Government
  - Type: Representative democracy

Area
  - Total: 397.10 km^{2} (153.32 sq mi)

Population (2011)
  - Total: 210,669
  - Density: 530.52/km^{2} (1,374.0/sq mi)

Languages
  - Official: Bengali, English
- Time zone: UTC+5:30 (IST)
- PIN: 332122
- STD/telephone code: 03511
- ISO 3166 code: IN-WB
- Vehicle registration: WB
- Lok Sabha constituency: Maldaha Uttar
- Vidhan Sabha constituency: Habibpur, Maldaha
- Website: malda.nic.in

Habibpur is a community development block that forms an administrative division in Malda Sadar subdivision of Malda district in the Indian state of West Bengal.

== History ==
=== Gauda and Pandua ===
Gauda was once the “capital of the ancient bhukti or political division of Bengal known as Pundravardhana which lay on the eastern extremity of the Gupta Empire.” During the rule of the Sena Dynasty, in the 11th-12th century, Gauda was rebuilt and extended as Lakshmanawati (later Lakhnauti), and it became the hub of the Sena empire. Gauda was conquered by Muhammad bin Bakhtiyar Khalji in 1205. During the Turko-Afghan period, “the city of Lakhnauti or Gauda continued to function initially as their capital but was abandoned in 1342 by the Ilyas Shahi sultans in favour of Pandua because of major disturbances along the river course of the Ganga.” “Pandua then lay on the banks of the Mahananda, which was the major waterway of the sultanate at the time. However, when the Mahananda too began to veer away from the site of Pandua in the mid-15th century, Gauda was rebuilt and restored to the status of capital city by the Hussain Shahi sultans”... With the ascent of Akbar to the Mughal throne at Delhi... the Mughals annexed the ancient region of Gauda in 1576 and created the Diwani of Bengal. The centre of regional power shifted across the Ganga to Rajmahal. Following the demise of the independent sultanate, the regional importance of the Gauda or Malda region declined irreversibly and the city of Gauda was eventually abandoned.

=== Malda district ===
With the advent of the British, their trading and commercial interests focused on the new cities of Malda and English Bazar. Malda district was formed in 1813 with “some portion of outlying areas of Purnia, Dinajpur and Rajshahi districts”. A separate treasury was established in 1832 and a full-fledged Magistrate and Collector was posted in 1859. Malda district was part of Rajshahi Division till 1876, when it was transferred to Bhagalpur Division, and again transferred in 1905 to Rajshahi Division. With the partition of Bengal in 1947, the Radcliffe Line placed Malda district in India, except the Nawabganj subdivision, which was placed in East Pakistan.

== Geography ==
Habibpur community development block is located at 25.0184177°N 88.3589172°E

Habibpur CD Block is a part of the Barind Tract, one of the three physiographic subregions of the district, that spreads beyond the boundaries of the district. “This region is made up of the ancient alluvial humps that are remnants of old riverine flood plains that remained unaffected subsequently by inundation and renewed silting.” It forms an upland slightly higher than the surrounding areas. Habibpur and Bamangola CD Blocks constitute the Tangon-Punarbhaba interfluves area. Barind soils permit little percolation and most of the monsoon runoff accumulates in the large natural bils (ponds) in the ravines formed by the courses of the Tangon and Punarbhaba rivers, covering the lowlands.

Habibpur is bounded by Gazole CD Block for a short stretch on the north-east corner, Bamangola CD Block on the north, Porsha Upazila of Naogaon District, Bangladesh, on the east, Gomostapur Upazila and Bholahat Upazila of Chapai Nawabganj District, Bangladesh, on the south, and Old Malda CD Block on the west.

Habibpur CD Block has an area of 397.10 km^{2}. It has 1 panchayat samity, 11 gram panchayats, 149 gram sansads (village councils), 288 mouzas and 233 inhabited villages. Habibpur police station serves this block. Headquarters of this CD Block is at Habibpur.

The ruins of a Pala period Buddhist University have been excavated at Jagajibanpur village near the Punarbhaba River in Habibpur CD Block.

165.5 km of the India-Bangladesh border is in Malda district. CD Blocks on the border are Bamangola, Habibpur, Old Malda, English Bazar and Kaliachak-III. The Punarbhaba flows along the international border in Bamangola and Habibpur CD Blocks.

Gram panchayats of Habibpur block/ panchayat samiti are:Mangalpura, Aktail, Baidyapur, Jajoil, Kanturka, Habibpur, Bulbulchandi, Aiho, Rishipur, Srirampur and Dhumpur.

== Demographics ==
=== Population ===
As per 2011 Census of India, Habibpur CD Block had a total population of 210,669, of which 185,342 were rural and 25,357 were urban. There were 106,757 (51%) males and 103,942 (49%) females. Population below 6 years was 26,815. Scheduled Castes numbered 105,386 (50.02%) and Scheduled Tribes numbered 61,337 (29.11%).

Census towns in Habibpur CD Block were (2011 population in brackets): Baksinagar (7,255), Kachu Pukur (5,752), Kendua (6,452) and Aiho (5,898).

Large villages (with 4,000+ population) in Habibpur CD Block were (2011 population in brackets): Chakli (4,211), Dalia (7,177) and Ganramari (5,636).

Other villages in Habibpur CD Block included (2011 population in brackets): Mangalpura (1,063), Baidyapur (497), Habibpur (2,576), Bulbulchandi (2,915), Rishipur (2,844), Srirampur (1,746), Jajail (268) and Singhabad (1951).

Decadal Population Growth Rate (%)

Note: The CD Block data for 1971–1981, 1981-1991 and 1991-2001 is for Habibpur PS

The decadal growth of population in Habibpur CD Block in 2001-2011 was 12.28%. The decadal growth of population in Habibpur PS covering Habibpur CD Block in 1991-2001 was 11.43%. The decadal growth of population in Habibpur PS in 1981-91 was 19.37% and in 1971-81 was 24.65%. The decadal growth rate of population in Malda district was as follows: 30.33% in 1951–61, 31.98% in 1961–71, 26.00% in 1971–81, 29.78% in 1981–91, 24.78% in 1991-2001 and 21.22% in 2001–11. The decadal growth rate for West Bengal in 2001-11 was 13.93%. The decadal growth rate for West Bengal was 13.93 in 2001–2011, 17.77% in 1991–2001. 24.73% in 1981-1991 and 23.17% in 1971–1981.

Malda district has the second highest decadal population growth rate, for the decade 2001–2011, in West Bengal with a figure of 21.2% which is much higher than the state average (13.8%). Uttar Dinajpur district has the highest decadal growth rate in the state with 23.2%. Decadal growth rate of population is higher than that of neighbouring Murshidabad district, which has the next highest growth rate.

As per the Refugee Relief and Rehabilitation Department of the Government of West Bengal and 1971 census, only 1.7% of around 6 million refugees who had come in from erstwhile East Pakistan, were resettled in Malda district. The Barind tract was opened for refugee resettlement in the aftermath of the partition.

Population density in the district has intensified from 162 persons per km^{2} in 1901 to 881 in 2001 (i.e., around five times), which is highest amongst the districts of North Bengal. However, unlike the densely populated southern regions of West Bengal, urbanisation remains low in Malda district. North Bengal in general, and Malda in particular, has been witness to large scale population movement from other states in India and other districts of West Bengal, as well as from outside the country. The District Human Development Report for Malda notes, “Malda district has been a principal recipient of the human migration waves of the 20th century.”

There are reports of Bangladeshi infiltrators coming through the international border. Only a small portion of the border with Bangladesh has been fenced and it is popularly referred to as a porous border.

=== Literacy ===
As per the 2011 census, the total number of literates in Habibpur CD Block was 108,136 (58.81% of the population over 6 years) out of which males numbered 62,033 (66.69% of the male population over 6 years) and females numbered 45,103 (49.63% of the female population over 6 years). The gender disparity (the difference between female and male literacy rates) was 17.06%.

See also – List of West Bengal districts ranked by literacy rate

Literacy in CD blocks of
Malda district
Malda Sadar subdivision
Gazole – 63.07%
Bamangola – 68.09%
Habibpur – 58.81%
Old Malda – 59.61%
English Bazar – 63.03%
Manikchak – 57.77%
Kaliachak I – 65.25%
Kaliachak II – 64.89%
Kaliachak III – 54.16%
Chanchal subdivision
Harishchandrapur I – 52.47%
Harishchandrapur II – 54.34%
Chanchal I – 65.09%
Chanchal II – 57.38%
Ratua I – 60.13%
Ratua II – 56.19%
Source: 2011 Census: CD Block Wise
Primary Census Abstract Data

=== Language and religion ===
Religion in Habibpur CD block (2011)
Hinduism	94.96%
Christianity	2.03%
Sarnaism	1.52%
Islam	1.28%
Other or not stated	0.21%

Hinduism is the predominant religion, with 94.96% of the population. Christianity is the second-largest religion, with Sarnaism and Islam as a micro-minority.

As per 2014 District Statistical Handbook: Malda (quoting census figures), in the 2001 census, Hindus numbered 170,880 and formed 91.06% of the population in Habibpur CD Block. Muslims numbered 2,305 and formed 1.23% of the population. Christians numbered 2,730 and formed 1.45% of the population. Others numbered 11,735 and formed 6.25% of the population.

Languages of Habibpur CD block (2011)
1. Bengali (66.6%)
2. Santali (27.3%)
3. Bhojpuri (1.74%)
4. Hindi (1.16%)
5. Khortha (1.15%)
6. 'Other' Bengali (1.01%)
7. Others (1.04%)

At the time of the 2011 census, 66.56% of the population spoke Bengali, 27.34% Santali, 1.74% Bhojpuri, 1.16% Hindi and 1.15% Khortha as their first language. 1.01% of the population spoke languages classified as 'Other' under Bengali.

== Rural poverty ==
As per the Human Development Report for Malda district, published in 2006, the percentage of rural families in BPL category in Habibpur CD Block was 49.0%. Official surveys have found households living in absolute poverty in Malda district to be around 39%.

According to the report, “An overwhelmingly large segment of the rural workforce depends on agriculture as its main source of livelihood, the extent of landlessness in Malda has traditionally been high because of the high densities of human settlement in the district… Although land reforms were implemented in Malda district from the time they were launched in other parts of West Bengal, their progress has been uneven across the Malda blocks… because of the overall paucity of land, the extent of ceiling-surplus land available for redistribution has never been large… The high levels of rural poverty that exist in nearly all blocks in Malda district closely reflect the livelihood crisis… “

== Economy ==
=== Livelihood ===
Livelihood
in Habibpur CD Block
1. Cultivators (23.1%)
2. Agricultural labourers (51.5%)
3. Household industries (5.06%)
4. Other Workers (20.3%)

In Habibpur CD Block in 2011, amongst the class of total workers, cultivators numbered 22,299 and formed 23.09%, agricultural labourers numbered 49,750 and formed 51.52%, household industry workers numbered 4,882 and formed 5.06% and other workers numbered 19,636 and formed 20.33%. Total workers numbered 96,568 and formed 45.83% of the total population, and non-workers numbered 114,131 and formed 54.17% of the population.

Note: In the census records a person is considered a cultivator, if the person is engaged in cultivation/ supervision of land owned by self/government/institution. When a person who works on another person's land for wages in cash or kind or share, is regarded as an agricultural labourer. Household industry is defined as an industry conducted by one or more members of the family within the household or village, and one that does not qualify for registration as a factory under the Factories Act. Other workers are persons engaged in some economic activity other than cultivators, agricultural labourers and household workers. It includes factory, mining, plantation, transport and office workers, those engaged in business and commerce, teachers, entertainment artistes and so on.

=== Infrastructure ===
There are 233 inhabited villages in Habibpur CD Block. All 243 villages (100%) have power supply. 229 villages (98.28%) have drinking water supply. 20 villages (8.58%) have post offices. 191 villages (81.97%) have telephones (including landlines, public call offices and mobile phones). 69 villages (29.61%) have a pucca (paved) approach road and 45 villages (19.31%) have transport communication (includes bus service, rail facility and navigable waterways). 7 villages (3%) have agricultural credit societies. 10 villages (4.29%) have banks.

=== Agriculture ===
The upland regions in the Barind area are mono-cropped because of limitations regarding the use of tube wells here.

Habibpur CD Block had 113 fertiliser depots, 13 seed stores and 60 fair price shops in 2013–14.

In 2013–14, Habibpur CD Block produced 5,164 tonnes of Aman paddy, the main winter crop from 1,967 hectares, 21,577 tonnes of Boro paddy (spring crop) from 5,280 hectares, 188 tonnes of Aus paddy (summer crop) from 97 hectares, 1,238 tonnes of wheat from 454 hectares, 19 tonnes of maize from 5 hectares, 2,025 tonnes of jute from 125 hectares and 8,452 tonnes of potatoes from 303 hectares. It also produced pulses and oilseeds.

In 2013–14, the total area irrigated in Habibpur CD Block was 10,770 hectares, out of which 358 hectares were irrigated by tank irrigation, 930 hectares by river lift irrigation, 197 hectares by deep tube wells, 3,678 hectares by shallow tube wells and 5,607 hectares by other means.

=== Backward Regions Grant Fund ===
Malda district is listed as a backward region and receives financial support from the Backward Regions Grant Fund. The fund, created by the Government of India, is designed to redress regional imbalances in development. As of 2012, 272 districts across the country were listed under this scheme. The list includes 11 districts of West Bengal.

== Transport ==
In 2013–14, Habibpur CD Block had 4 ferry services and 4 originating/ terminating bus routes.

The railway track from Old Malda to Singhabad railway station passes through the Habibpur CD Block and there is an intermediate station at Bulbulchandi. The Singhabad-Rohanpur link is an active rail transit system across the India-Bangladesh border.

== Education ==
In 2013–14, Habibpur CD Block had 155 primary schools with 16,805 students, 12 middle schools with 1,802 students, and Total 11 high schools with 4,104 students and 12 higher secondary schools with 29,654 students. Habibpur CD Block had 2 technical/ professional institutions with 147 students and 649 institutions for special and non-formal education with 12,945 students.

As per the 2011 census, in Habibpur CD Block, amongst the 233 inhabited villages, 61 villages did not have a school, 143 villages had more than 1 primary school, 29 villages had at least 1 primary and 1 middle school and 13 villages had at least 1 middle and 1 secondary school.

== Healthcare ==
In 2014, Habibpur CD Block had 1 rural hospital and 2 primary health centres, with total 60 beds and 7 doctors (excluding private bodies). It had 43 family welfare subcentres. 6,647 patients were treated indoor and 206,439 patients were treated outdoor in the hospitals, health centres and subcentres of the CD Block.

R.N.Roy Rural Hospital at Bulbulchandi (with 30 beds) is the main medical facility in Habibpur CD Block. There are primary health centres at Manikora (Bahadurpur PHC) (with 10 beds) and Goramary (Rishipur PHC) (with 4 beds).
