= Kachu Pukur =

- Census Town
- Location in West Bengal, India Kachu Pukur (India)
- Coordinates: 25.00°N 88.27°E
- Country: India
- State: West Bengal
- District: Malda

Area
  - Total: 0.81 km^{2} (0.31 sq mi)

Population (2011)
  - Total: 5,752
  - Density: 7,100/km^{2} (18,000/sq mi)

Languages
  - Official: Bengali
  - Additional official: English
- Time zone: UTC+5:30 (IST)
- PIN: 732122
- Telephone/ STD code: 03511
- Vehicle registration: WB
- Lok Sabha constituency: Maldaha Uttar
- Vidhan Sabha constituency: Habibpur
- Website: malda.nic.in

Kachu Pukur is a census town in the Habibpur CD block in the Malda Sadar subdivision of Malda district in the Indian state of West Bengal.

== Geography ==
Cities, towns and locations in the northern portion of Malda district (including Chanchal subdivision and Old Malda, Habibpur, Bamangola and Gazole CD blocks)
M: municipal town, CT: census town, R: rural/ urban centre, F: Facility, H: historical centre
Owing to space constraints in the small map, the actual locations in a larger map may vary slightly

=== Location ===
Kachu Pukur is located at 25.00°N 88.27°E.

=== Area overview ===
The area shown in the adjacent map covers two physiographic regions – the Barind in the east and the tal in the west. The eastern part is comparatively high (up to 40 metres above mean sea level at places) and uneven. The soils of the eastern region are “hard salty clays of a reddish hue and the ground is baked hard as iron.” It lies to the east of the Mahananda River. The area lying to the west of the Mahananda River, the tal, is a flat low land and “is strewn with innumerable marshes, bils and oxbow lakes.” The tal area is prone to flooding by local rivers. The total area is overwhelmingly rural. There are two important historical/ archaeological sites in the area – Pandua and Jagjivanpur.

Note: The map alongside presents some of the notable locations in the area. All places marked in the map are linked in the larger full screen map.

== Demographics ==
According to the 2011 Census of India, Kachu Pukur had a total population of 5,752, of which 2,793 (52%) were males and 2,779 (48%) were females. Population in the age range 0–6 years was 518. The total number of literate persons in Kachu Pukur was 4,451 (85.04% of the population over 6 years).

As of 2001 India census, Kachu Pukur had a population of 5348. Males constitute 51% of the population and females 49%. Kachu Pukur has an average literacy rate of 71%, higher than the national average of 59.5%: male literacy is 77%, and female literacy is 64%. In Kachu Pukur, 12% of the population is under 6 years of age.

== Infrastructure ==
According to the District Census Handbook, Maldah, 2011, Kachu Pukur covered an area of 0.81 km^{2}. The protected water-supply involved overhead tank, tap water from treated sources, tube well/ bore well. It had 1,175 domestic electric connections, 280 road lighting points. Among the medical facilities it had 1 hospital (with 30 beds), 6 medicine shops. Among the educational facilities, it had 3 primary schools, 1 secondary school.
