= Aiho =

- Census Town
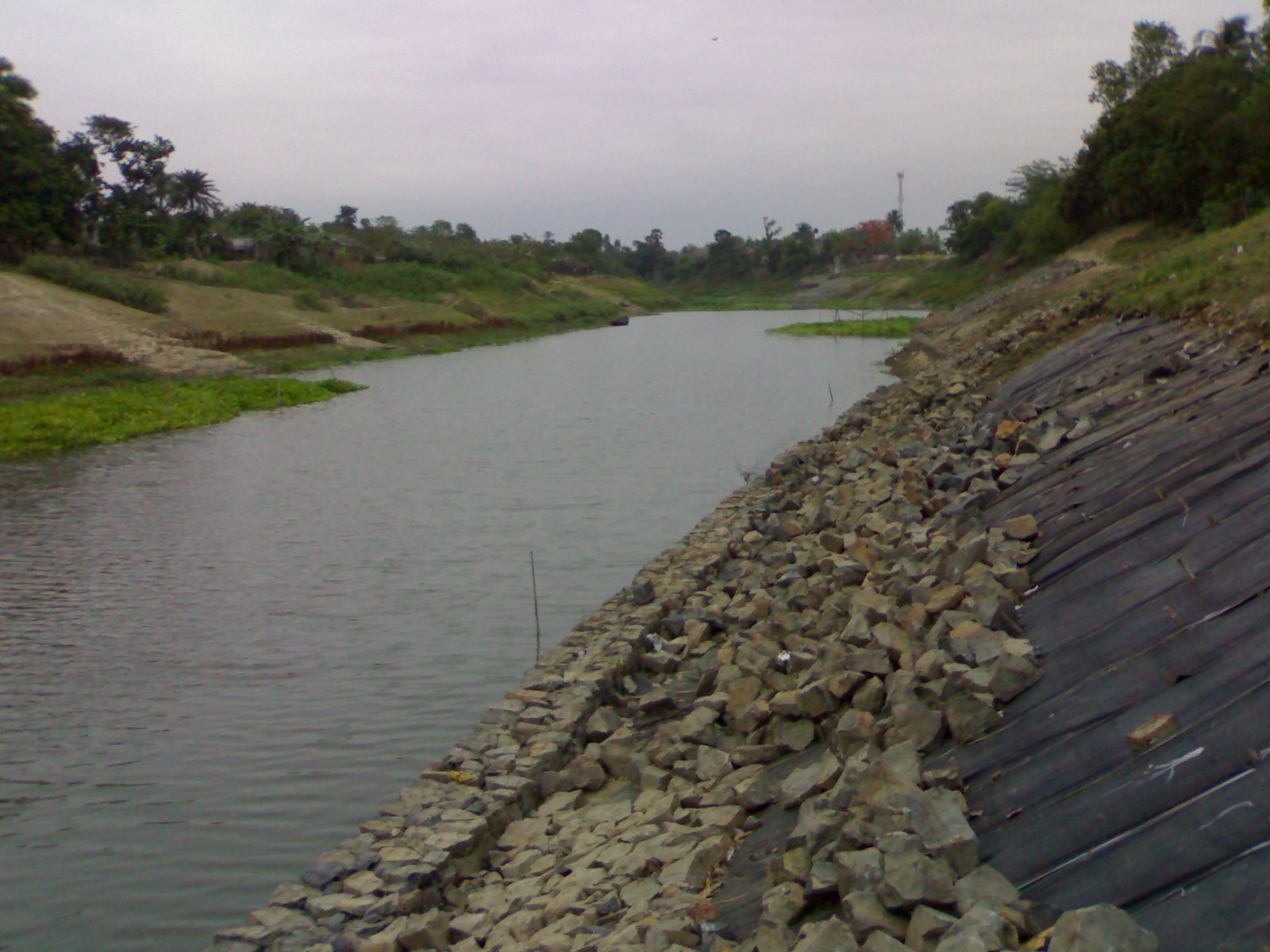
- Tangon River at Aiho

- Location in West Bengal, India Aiho (India)
- Coordinates: 24.96°N 88.24°E
- Country: India
- State: West Bengal
- District: Malda

Area
  - Total: 0.73 km^{2} (0.28 sq mi)

Population (2011)
  - Total: 5,898
  - Density: 8,100/km^{2} (21,000/sq mi)

Languages
  - Official: Bengali
  - Additional official: English
- Time zone: UTC+5:30 (IST)
- PIN: 732121
- Telephone/ STD code: 03511
- Vehicle registration: WB
- Lok Sabha constituency: Maldaha Uttar
- Vidhan Sabha constituency: Maldaha
- Website: malda.nic.in

Aiho is a census town in the Habibpur CD block in the Malda Sadar subdivision of Malda district in the Indian state of West Bengal.

== Geography ==
Cities, towns and locations in the northern portion of Malda district (including Chanchal subdivision and Old Malda, Habibpur, Bamangola and Gazole CD blocks)
M: municipal town, CT: census town, R: rural/ urban centre, F: Facility, H: historical centre
Owing to space constraints in the small map, the actual locations in a larger map may vary slightly

=== Location ===
Aiho is located at 24.96°N 88.24°E.

=== Area overview ===
The area shown in the adjacent map covers two physiographic regions – the Barind in the east and the tal in the west. The eastern part is comparatively high (up to 40 metres above mean sea level at places) and uneven. The soils of the eastern region are “hard salty clays of a reddish hue and the ground is baked hard as iron.” It lies to the east of the Mahananda River. The area lying to the west of the Mahananda River, the tal, is a flat low land and “is strewn with innumerable marshes, bils and oxbow lakes.” The tal area is prone to flooding by local rivers. The total area is overwhelmingly rural. There are two important historical/ archaeological sites in the area – Pandua and Jagjivanpur.

Note: The map alongside presents some of the notable locations in the area. All places marked in the map are linked in the larger full screen map.

== Demographics ==
According to the 2011 Census of India, Aiho had a total population of 5,898, of which 2,982 (51%) were males and 2,916 (49%) were females. Population in the age range 0–6 years was 605. The total number of literate persons in Aiho was 4,181 (78.99% of the population over 6 years).

As of 2001 India census, Aiho had a population of 5,407. Males constitute 50% of the population and females 50%. Aiho has an average literacy rate of 61%, higher than the national average of 59.5%; with 54% of the males and 46% of females literate. 13% of the population is under 6 years of age.

== Infrastructure ==
According to the District Census Handbook, Maldah, 2011, Aiho covered an area of 0.73 km^{2}. It had 4 km roads with both open and closed drains. The protected water-supply involved overhead tank, tap water from treated sources, hand pump. It had 390 domestic electric connections. Among the medical facilities it had 1 dispensary/ health centre, 1 veterinary hospital, 8 medicine shops. Among the educational facilities, it had 4 primary schools, 2 middle schools, 2 secondary schools, 2 senior secondary schools. The nearest general degree college at Malda 16 km away. Among the social, cultural and recreational facilities it had 1 working women’s hostel, 1 cinema theatre, 1 public library, 1 reading room. It produced rice, beedi. It had branch offices of 1 nationalised bank, 1 cooperative bank, 1 agricultural credit society.

== Education ==
Aiho High School is a Bengali-medium co-educational institution established in 1900. It has facilities for teaching from class V to class XII. It has a playground, a library with 3,950 books, and 5 computers for teaching and learning purposes.

Aiho Girls High School is a Bengali-medium girls only institution established in 1932. It is a Kasturba Gandhi Balika Vidyalaya in nature. It has facilities for teaching from class V to class XII. It has a library with 450 books, and 10 computers for teaching and learning purposes.
