= Khagen Murmu =

Indian politician (born 1960)

Member of Parliament, Lok Sabha
- Incumbent
- Assumed office 23 May 2019
- Preceded by: Mausam Noor
- Constituency: Maldaha Uttar

Member of West Bengal Legislative Assembly
- In office 13 May 2001 – 23 May 2019
- Preceded by: Jadu Hembrom
- Succeeded by: Joyel Murmu
- Constituency: Habibpur

Personal details
- Born: 2 February 1960 (age 66) Shekhpara, Malda district, West Bengal, India
- Party: Bharatiya Janata Party (2019 - present)
- Other political affiliations: Communist Party of India (Marxist) (1986 - 2019)
- Spouse: Manju Kisku
- Children: 4
- Education: University of Magadh (Bachelor of Arts)
- Occupation: Social worker
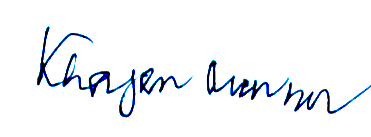
- Signature

Khagen Murmu (born 2 February 1960) is an Indian politician and Member of Parliament from Maldaha Uttar. He is a member of the Bharatiya Janata Party from West Bengal. He has served three terms as an MLA from Habibpur constituency as member of CPI(M) from 2006 to 2019 and 2 times Zilla Parishad Member as Bidyut Karmadkha and Served as a Sahakari Sabhadhipati from Malda Zilla Parishad 1993-2003.

== Personal life ==
Murmu was born on 2 February 1960 to Jalo Murmu and Sakro Hembrom in Shekhpar of Malda district in the state of West Bengal. He completed his graduation in Bachelor of Arts from Magadh University, Patna. Murmu married Manju Kisku on 10 May 1985, with whom he has three sons and a daughter. Murmu is also a social worker.

== Political career ==
Murmu is a Santhali leader. He was first elected from Habibpur constituency as member of CPI(M) in 2001. In 2019 he joined Bharatiya Janata Party and was selected for Lok Sabha 2019 Indian general election from Maldaha Uttar (Lok Sabha constituency).

On 6 October 2025, Murmu sustained head injuries when his car was pelted with stones in Nagrakata. Murmu and his colleague, Shankar Ghosh, were visiting flood-affected areas in north Bengal when their car was surrounded by a crowd who started throwing stones at them.

Lok Sabha
Preceded by Mausam Noor	Member of Parliament, Lok Sabha from Maldaha Uttar; 2019 –	Succeeded by
State Legislative Assembly
Preceded by Jadu Hembrom	Member of the West Bengal Legislative Assembly from Habibpur Assembly constituency 2006 – 2019	Succeeded by Joyel Murmu
