= Bhupendra Nath Halder =

Indian politician

West Bengal Legislative Assembly
- Preceded by: Subhendu Chowdhury
- Succeeded by: Gopal Chandra Saha
- Constituency: Maldaha (Vidhan Sabha constituency)

Personal details
- Party: INC
- Occupation: Politician

Bhupendra Nath Halder is an Indian politician from West Bengal and a member of the West Bengal Legislative Assembly. Halder won the Maldaha (Vidhan Sabha constituency) on the INC ticket in the 2016 West Bengal Legislative Assembly election.
