= Gopal Chandra Saha =

Indian politician

Member of the West Bengal Legislative Assembly
- In office 2 May 2021 – Incumbent
- Preceded by: Bhupendra Nath Halder
- Constituency: Maldaha

Personal details
- Party: Bharatiya Janata Party
- Education: Bachelor of Science
- Alma mater: Dr. Ram Manohar Lohia Degree College, Kanpur
- Profession: Business

Gopal Chandra Saha is an Indian politician from Bharatiya Janata Party. In May 2021, he was elected as a member of the West Bengal Legislative Assembly from Maldaha (constituency). He defeated Ujjwal Kumar Chowdhury of All India Trinamool Congress by 15,456 votes in 2021 West Bengal Assembly election.
