= Habibpur Union =

Habibpur Union হবিবপুর ইউনিয়ন
- Union Council
- Habibpur Union Council
- Location in Bangladesh
- Country: Bangladesh
- Division: Sylhet Division
- District: Sunamganj District
- Upazila: Sullah Upazila

Government
  - Chairman: Suval Chandra Das
  - MP (Sunamganj-2): Nasir Uddin Chowdhury

Population
  - Total: 29,534
- Demonym: Habibpuri
- Time zone: UTC+6 (BST)
- Website: habibpurup.sunamganj.gov.bd

Habibpur Union Council (Bengali: হবিবপুর ইউনিয়ন পরিষদ) is a Union Parishad under Sullah Upazila of Sunamganj District in the Sylhet Division of Bangladesh. It has an area of 75.26 square kilometres and a population of 29,534.

== Geography ==
The Habibpur Union has an area of 75.26 square kilometres. Its geographical location extends from 24°34′ to 24°49′ North latitude and from 91°08′ to 91°23′ East longitude. It borders Atgaon Union in the west, Bahara Union in the south, and Taral Union (Derai Upazila) in the north and east.

== History ==
Habibpur Union was founded in 1962.

== Demography ==
Habibpur has a population of 29,534.

== Administration ==
Habibpur constitutes the no. 2 union council of Sullah Upazila. It contains 32 villages (20 mouzas) categorised into 9 wards:

1. Kashipur, Bholanagar, Rampur
2. Niamatpur, Chargaon, Anandapur
3. Chakua, Pashchimpara, Maheshpur
4. Habibpur, Dhitpur, Noagaon
5. Duttapara, Shaskhai, Bilpur, Saraspur
6. Narayanpur, Aguai, Maurapur
7. Brahmangaon, Asanpur, Jatgaon, Putka, Khalapara
8. Narkila, Bharaut, Tukchanpur, Markuli, Qadirganj
9. Fayzullahpur, Anandanagar, Vishanpur, Saudhersri

=== List of chairmen ===
Name	Term	Notes
Advocate Abdul Matin
Suresh Chandra Das
Prabhanshu Chaudhuri
Muhammad Sadir Miah
Adhiraranjana Das
Somachand Das
Hari Mohan Chaudhuri
Suvala Chandra Das
Vivekananda Majumdar Bakul

== Education and culture ==
The Union has many mosques, madrasas eidgahs. Habibpuris converse in their native dialect but can also converse in Standard Bengali. Languages such as Arabic and English are also taught in schools.
