= Bholahat Upazila =

Bholahat ভোলাহাট
- Upazila
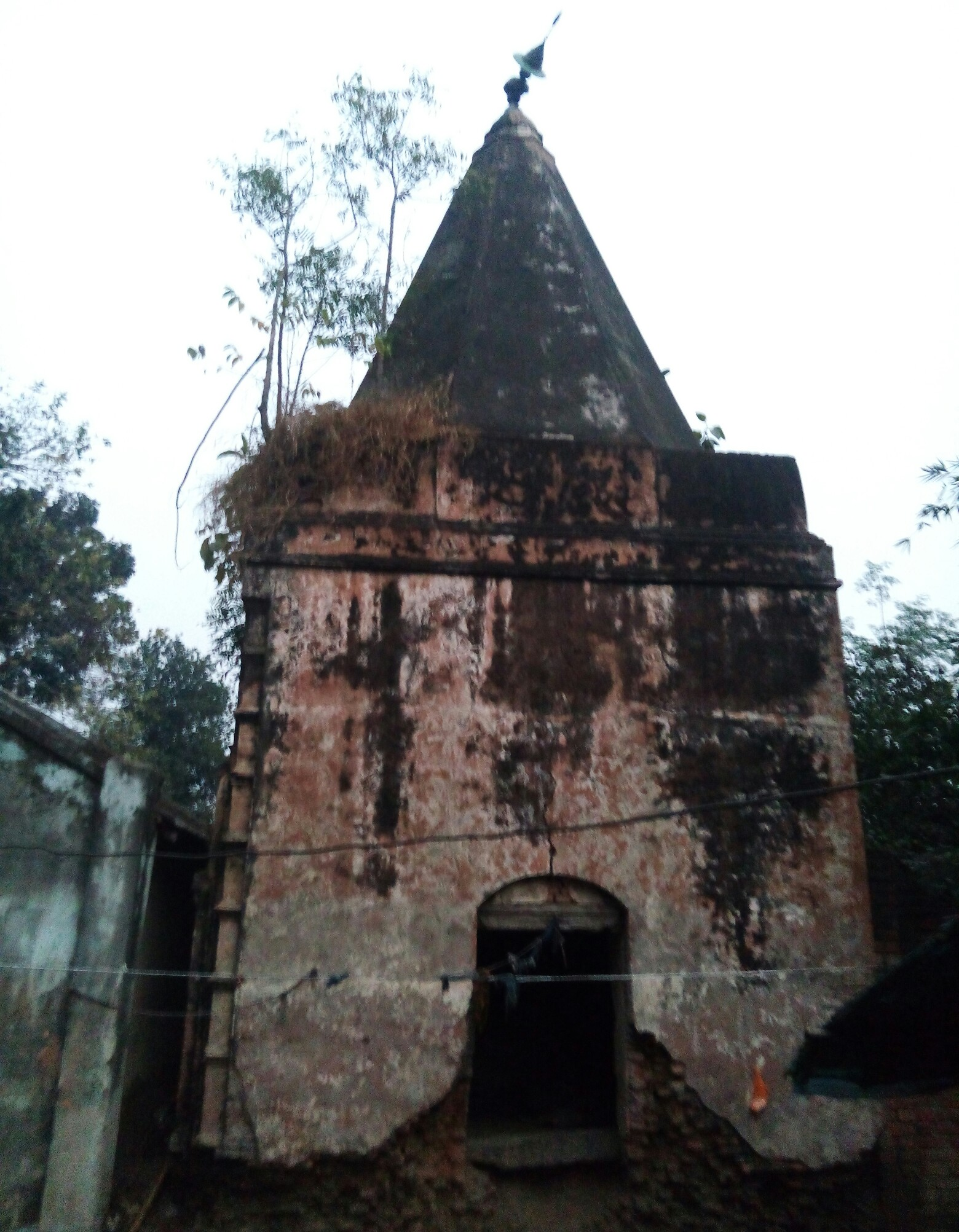
- A temple in Bholahat upazila

- Coordinates: 24°56′45″N 88°13′40″E
- Country: Bangladesh
- Division: Rajshahi
- District: Chapai Nawabganj

Area
  - Total: 123.53 km^{2} (47.70 sq mi)

Population (2022)
  - Total: 113,314
  - Density: 917.30/km^{2} (2,375.8/sq mi)
- Time zone: UTC+6 (BST)
- Postal code: 6330
- Website: Official Map of Bholahat

Bholahat Upazila mauza geocode map

Bholahat (Bengali: ভোলাহাট) is an upazila of Chapainawabganj District in Rajshahi Division, Bangladesh.

== Geography ==
Its total area of 123.53 km^{2}. The Indian border is surrounded on 3 sides by this Upazila. The Mahananda River, Bil Vatia and Mango garden divide this Upazila from India.

Bholahat Upazila is bounded by Old Malda CD Block in Malda district, West Bengal, India on the north, Habibpur CD Block in Malda district on the east, Shibganj and Gomostapur Upazilas on the south and English Bazar CD Block in Malda district, on the west.

== Demographics ==
Religions in Bholahat Upazila (2022)
Religion	Percent
Islam	99.99%
Hinduism	0.01%
Other or not stated	0.00%

According to the 2022 Bangladeshi census, Bholahat Upazila had 28,969 households and a population of 113,314. 9.64% of the population were under 5 years of age. Bholahat had a literacy rate (age 7 and over) of 74.17%: 73.41% for males and 74.89% for females, and a sex ratio of 95.16 males for every 100 females. 15,235 (13.44%) lived in urban areas.

According to the 2011 Census of Bangladesh, Bholahat Upazila had 24,475 households and a population of 103,301. 23,695 (22.94%) were under 10 years of age. Bholahat had a literacy rate (age 7 and over) of 47.17%, compared to the national average of 51.8%, and a sex ratio of 1024 females per 1000 males. 13,726 (13.29%) lived in urban areas.

According to the 2001 Bangladesh census, Bholahat had a population of 92,149. Males constituted 50.58% of the population, and females 49.42%. There were 19,257 households. Bholahat had an average literacy rate of 39.22%, comprising a male literacy rate of 39.71% and female literacy rate of 38.74%.

== Administration ==
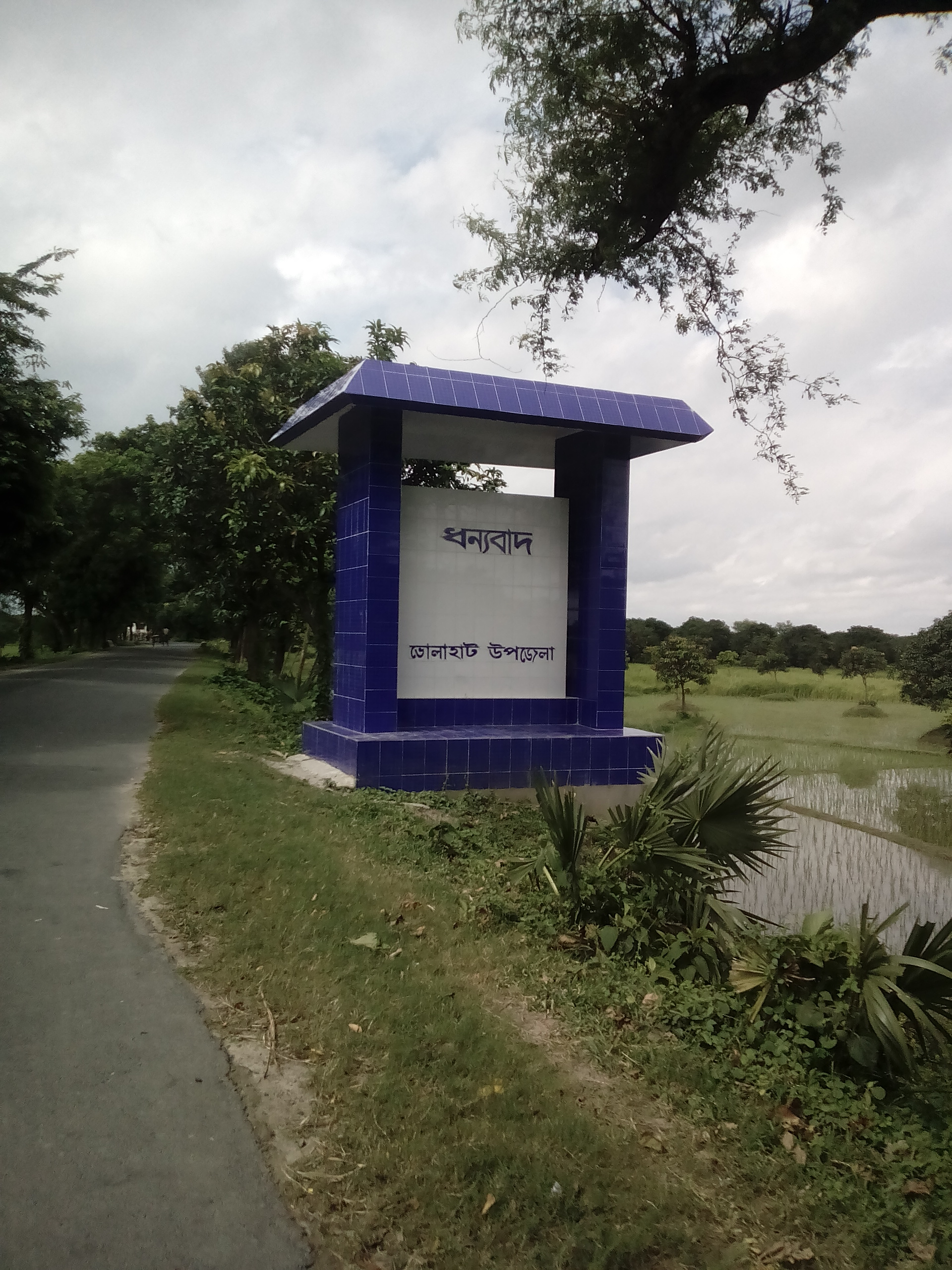
Bholahat Entrance

Bholahat Upazila is divided into Bholahat Municipality and four union parishads: Bholahat, Daldoli, Gohalbari, and Jambaria. The union parishads are subdivided into 45 mauzas and 100 villages.

== See also ==
- Upazilas of Bangladesh
- Districts of Bangladesh
- Divisions of Bangladesh
- Administrative geography of Bangladesh
