= Joyel Murmu =

Indian politician

Minister of State, Government of West Bengal
- Incumbent
- Assumed office 1 June 2026
- Governor: R. N. Ravi
- Chief Minister: Suvendu Adhikari

Member of the West Bengal Legislative Assembly
- Incumbent
- Assumed office 23 May 2019
- Preceded by: Khagen Murmu
- Constituency: Habibpur

Personal details
- Party: Bharatiya Janata Party

Joyel Murmu is an Indian politician. He was elected to the West Bengal Legislative Assembly from Habibpur, West Bengal in the by-election in 2019 as a member of the Bharatiya Janata Party.

State Legislative Assembly
Preceded by Khagen Murmu; Communist Party of India (Marxist)	Member of the West Bengal Legislative Assembly from Habibpur Assembly constituency 2019 –	Incumbent
