= Maldaha Assembly constituency =

Vidhan Sabha Constituency in West Bengal, India

Maldaha
- Constituency No. 50 for the West Bengal Legislative Assembly
- Interactive Map Outlining Maldaha Assembly Constituency

Constituency details
- Country: India
- Region: East India
- State: West Bengal
- District: Malda
- Lok Sabha constituency: Maldaha Uttar
- Established: 1951
- Total electors: 245,962
- Reservation: SC

Member of Legislative Assembly
- 18th West Bengal Legislative Assembly
- Incumbent Gopal Chandra Saha
- Party: BJP
- Alliance: NDA
- Elected year: 2026

Maldaha Assembly constituency is an assembly constituency in Maldah district in the Indian state of West Bengal. It is reserved for scheduled castes.

== Overview ==
As per orders of the Delimitation Commission, No. 50 Maldaha Assembly constituency (SC) covers Old Malda Municipality, Old Malda, Narhatta gram panchayat of English Bazar community development block, and Aiho, Rishipur and Sreerampur gram panchayats of Habibpur community development block.

Maldah Assembly constituency is part of No. 7 Maldaha Uttar (Lok Sabha constituency). It was earlier part of Malda (Lok Sabha constituency).

== Members of the Legislative Assembly ==
Year	Name	Party
1951	Nikunja Behari Gupta	Indian National Congress
1951	Raipada Das	Independent politician
1957	Nikunja Behari Gupta	Indian National Congress
1957	Matia Murmu	Indian National Congress
1962	Dharanidhar Sarkar	Communist Party of India
1967	Md Sayeed Mia	Indian National Congress
1969	Mahammad Gafurur Rahman	Indian National Congress
1971	Mahammad Gafurur Rahman	Indian National Congress
1972	Mahammad Gafurur Rahman	Indian National Congress
1972^	Siddhartha Shankar Ray	Indian National Congress
1977	Subhendu Chowdhury	Communist Party of India
1982	Phani Bhusan Roy	Indian National Congress
1987	Subhendu Chowdhury	Communist Party of India
1991	Subhendu Chowdhury	Communist Party of India
1996	Phani Bhusan Roy	Indian National Congress
2001	Subhendu Chowdhury	Communist Party of India
2006	Subhendu Chowdhury	Communist Party of India
2011	Bhupendra Nath Halder	Indian National Congress
2016	Bhupendra Nath Halder	Indian National Congress
2021	Gopal Chandra Saha	Bharatiya Janata Party
2026	Gopal Chandra Saha	Bharatiya Janata Party

- ^ by-election

== Election results ==
=== 2026 ===
2026 West Bengal Legislative Assembly election: Maldaha
Party	Candidate	Votes	%	±%
BJP	Gopal Chandra Saha	123,656	56.00	▲10.77
AITC	Lipika Barman Ghosh	73,528	33.30	▼4.45
INC	Bhupendra Nath	12,977	5.88	▼6.98
CPI	Dipak Barman	2,332	1.06	
NOTA	None of the above	2,201	1.00	▼0.36
Majority		50,128	22.70	▲15.22
Turnout		220,797	95.24	▲11.29
BJP hold		Swing		

=== 2021 ===
In the 2021 election, Gopal Chandra Saha of BJP defeated his nearest rival, Ujjwal Kumar Chowdhury of Trinamool Congress.

2021 West Bengal Legislative Assembly election: Maldaha
Party	Candidate	Votes	%	±%
BJP	Gopal Chandra Saha	93,398	45.23	
AITC	Ujjwal Kumar Chowdhury	77,942	37.75	
INC	Bhupendra Nath Halder	26,563	12.86	
Independent	Sujit Kumar Moulik	2,128	1.03	
NOTA	None of the above	2,818	1.36	
Majority		15,456	7.48	
Turnout		206,489	83.95	
BJP gain from INC		Swing		

=== 2016 ===
In the 2016 election, Bhupendra Nath Halder of Congress defeated his nearest rival, Dulal Sarkar of Trinamool Congress.

2016 West Bengal Legislative Assembly election: Maldaha
Party	Candidate	Votes	%	±%
INC	Bhupendra Nath Halder	88,243	48.36	+1.81
AITC	Dulal Sarkar (Babla)	54,934	30.10	
BJP	Gopal Chandra Saha	29,111	15.95	+6.95
JDP	Swapan Sarkar	2,703	1.48	
NOTA	None of the above	2,204	1.21	
Majority		33,309	18.25	
Turnout		1,82,564	86.41	
INC hold		Swing		

=== 2011 ===
In the 2011 election, Bhupendra Nath Halder of Congress defeated his nearest rival, Rahul Ranjan Das of CPI(M).

2011 West Bengal Legislative Assembly election: Maldaha
Party	Candidate	Votes	%	±%
INC	Bhupendra Nath Halder	68,155	46.55	+3.43#
CPI(M)	Rahul Ranjan Das	57,400	39.21	−1.94
BJP	Kusum Roy	13,180	9.00	
IND	Niren Rajbanshi	3,066	2.09	
IND	Debashis Sarkar	2,352	1.60	
Majority		10,755	7.35	
Turnout		1,46,469	86.39	
INC gain from CPI(M)		Swing	+5.37#	

.# Swing based on Congress+Trinamool Congress vote percentages taken together in 2006.

=== 2006 ===
In 2006 and 2001 state assembly elections, Subhendu Chowdhury of CPI(M) won the Maldaha (SC) assembly seat defeating his nearest rivals Bhupendra Nath Halder of Congress and Phani Bhusan Roy of Trinamool Congress respectively. Contests in most years were multi cornered but only winners and runners are being mentioned. Phani Bhusan Roy of Congress defeated Subhendu Chowdhury of CPI(M) in 1996. Subhendu Chowdhury of CPI(M) defeated Phani Bhusan Roy of Congress in 1991 and 1987. Phani Bhusan Roy of Congress defeated Subhendu Chowdhury of CPI(M) in 1982. Subhendu Chowdhury of CPI(M) defeated Phani Bhusan Roy of Congress in 1977.

=== 1972 ===
Mahammad Gafurur Rahaman of Congress won in 1972, 1971 and 1969. S.Mia of Congress won in 1967. Dharanidhar Sarkar of CPI won in 1962. Malda was a joint seat in 1957 and 1951. Nikunja Behari Gupta and Matla Murmu, both of Congress, won in 1957. Nikunja Behari Gupta of Congress and Raipada Das, Independent, won in independent India's first election in 1951.
