= Habibpur Assembly constituency =

Habibpur
- Constituency No. 43 for the West Bengal Legislative Assembly
- Interactive Map Outlining Habibpur Assembly Constituency

Constituency details
- Country: India
- Region: East India
- State: West Bengal
- District: Malda
- Lok Sabha constituency: Maldaha Uttar
- Established: 1962
- Total electors: 249,557
- Reservation: ST

Member of Legislative Assembly
- 18th West Bengal Legislative Assembly
- Incumbent Joyel Murmu
- Party: BJP
- Alliance: NDA
- Elected year: 2026

Habibpur Assembly constituency is an assembly constituency in Malda district in the Indian state of West Bengal. It is reserved for scheduled tribes.

== Overview ==
As per orders of the Delimitation Commission, No. 43 Habibpur Assembly constituency (ST) covers Bamangola community development block and Aktail, Baidyapur, Bulbul Chandi, Dhumpur, Habibpur, Jajail, Kanturka and Mangalpur gram panchayats of Habibpur community development block.

Habibpur Assembly constituency is part of No. 7 Maldaha Uttar (Lok Sabha constituency). It was earlier part of Malda (Lok Sabha constituency).

== Members of the Legislative Assembly ==
Year	Name	Party
1962	Nimai Chand Murmu	Communist Party of India
1967	B. Murmu	Indian National Congress
1969	Nimai Chand Murmu	Communist Party of India
1971	Sarkar Murmu	Independent politician
1972	Rabindranath Murmu	Communist Party of India
1977	Sarkar Murmu	Communist Party of India (Marxist)
1982	Sarkar Murmu	Communist Party of India (Marxist)
1987	Sarkar Murmu	Communist Party of India (Marxist)
1991	Sarkar Murmu	Communist Party of India (Marxist)
1996	Jadu Hembrom	Communist Party of India (Marxist)
2001	Khagen Murmu	Communist Party of India (Marxist)
2006	Khagen Murmu	Communist Party of India (Marxist)
2011	Khagen Murmu	Communist Party of India (Marxist)
2016	Khagen Murmu	Communist Party of India (Marxist)
2019^	Joyel Murmu	Bharatiya Janata Party
2021	Joyel Murmu	Bharatiya Janata Party
2026	Joyel Murmu	Bharatiya Janata Party

- ^ denotes by-election

== Election results ==
Vote share of Winning candidates
2026	62.41%
2021	47.52%
2019 (bypoll)	50.93%
2016	34.76%
2011	37.60%
2006	45.67%
2001	46.42%
1996	48.00%
1991	44.33%
1987	54.12%
1982	48.45%
1977	45.18%
1972	60.40%
1971	34.29%
1969	47.14%
1967	47.46%
1962	59.43%

=== 2026 ===
2026 West Bengal Legislative Assembly election: Habibpur
Party	Candidate	Votes	%	±%
BJP	Joyel Murmu	142,062	62.41	▲14.89
AITC	Amal Kisku	63,874	28.06	▼9.6
CPI(M)	Basudev Murmu	8,725	3.83	▼3.14
Independent	Baburam Kisku	4,579	2.01	
INC	Rajen Soren	2,490	1.09	
NOTA	None of the above	2,119	0.93	▼0.16
Majority		78,188	34.35	▲24.49
Turnout		227,613	95.43	▲16.09
BJP hold		Swing		

=== 2021 ===
2021 West Bengal Legislative Assembly election: Habibpur
Party	Candidate	Votes	%	±%
BJP	Joyel Murmu	94,075	47.52	
AITC	Prodip Baskey	74,558	37.66	
CPI(M)	Thakur Tudu	13,805	6.97	
BMP	Subin Hansda	5,896	2.98	
API	Pratap Koramudi	1,887	0.95	
NOTA	None of the above	2,162	1.09	
Majority		19,517	9.86	
Turnout		197,989	79.34	
BJP hold		Swing		

=== 2019 bypoll ===
By-polls were held on the seat due to resignation of the incumbent MLA Khagen Murmu, who had been elected as the MP for North Maldaha on a BJP ticket.

2019 West Bengal Legislative Assembly by-election: Habibpur (ST)
Party	Candidate	Votes	%	±%
BJP	Joyel Murmu	92,300	50.93	+28.34
AITC	Amal Kisku	61,687	34.04	+0.64
CPI(M)	Sadhu Tudu	10,076	5.56	−29.20
INC	Rejina Murmu	8,277	4.57	N/A
BMP	Baburam Kisku	4,471	2.47	+0.96
Independent	Mandal Mardi	1,605	0.89	−0.69
KPPU	Sangita Soren	722	0.40	N/A
JMM	Imanuyel Hembrom	508	0.28	N/A
NOTA	None of the above	1,593	0.88	−1.16
Majority		30,613	16.89	
Turnout		1,81,239	75.49	−7.16
Registered electors		2,40,071		
BJP gain from CPI(M)		Swing	+28.77	

=== 2016 ===
2016 West Bengal Legislative Assembly election: Habibpur (ST)
Party	Candidate	Votes	%	±%
CPI(M)	Khagen Murmu	64,095	34.76	
AITC	Amal Kisku	61,583	33.40	
BJP	Prodip Baskey	41,656	22.59	
NOTA	None of the Above	3,755	2.04	
Independent	Mandal Mardi	2,918	1.58	
BMP	Subin Hansda	2,780	1.51	
Independent	Mandal Soren	2,757	1.50	
SP	Lakshiram Baske	2,510	1.36	
BSP	Pradeep Murmu	1,567	0.85	
SUCI(C)	Shibananda Saren	748	0.41	
Majority		2,512	1.36	
Turnout		184,369	82.65	
CPI(M) hold		Swing		

=== 2011 ===
2011 West Bengal Legislative Assembly election: Habibpur (ST)
Party	Candidate	Votes	%	±%
CPI(M)	Khagen Murmu	59,286	37.60	
AITC	Mohan Tudu	57,028	36.17	
BJP	Krishna Chandra Munda	31,638	20.07	
Independent	Amin Tudu	6,244	3.96	
BSP	Jageswar Hembram	3,466	2.20	
Majority		2,258	1.43	
Turnout		157,662	84.31	
CPI(M) hold		Swing		

=== 2006 ===
2006 West Bengal Legislative Assembly election: Habibpur (ST)
Party	Candidate	Votes	%	±%
CPI(M)	Khagen Murmu	56,477	45.67	
BJP	Ramlal Hansda	47,283	38.24	
INC	Meri Mahali	8,138	6.58	
Independent	Manjla Mardi	3,655	2.96	
Independent	Hopna Mardi	2,768	2.24	
Independent	Salkan Murmu	2,288	1.85	
BSP	Pradeep Murmu	1,574	1.27	
Independent	Emeli Hembram	1,478	1.20	
Majority		9,194	7.43	
Turnout				
CPI(M) hold		Swing		

=== 2001 ===
2001 West Bengal Legislative Assembly election: Habibpur (ST)
Party	Candidate	Votes	%	±%
CPI(M)	Jadu Hemrom	43,992	46.42	
BJP	Ramlal Hansda	25,798	27.22	
INC	Jay Murmu (Soren)	20,414	21.54	
Independent	Imanuel Saren (Bhim)	4,574	4.83	
Majority		18,194	19.20	
Turnout		95,237	67.50	
CPI(M) hold		Swing		

=== 1996 ===
1996 West Bengal Legislative Assembly election: Habibpur (ST)
Party	Candidate	Votes	%	±%
CPI(M)	Jadu Hembram	55,288	48.00	
INC	Lucas Hembram	37,395	32.46	
BJP	Jetha Hembram	20,532	17.82	
Independent	Hopna Mardi	1,144	0.99	
Independent	Raphael Tudu	486	0.42	
Independent	Shibananda Soren	350	0.30	
Majority		17,893	15.54	
Turnout		117,550	85.13	
CPI(M) hold		Swing		

=== 1991 ===
1991 West Bengal Legislative Assembly election: Habibpur (ST)
Party	Candidate	Votes	%	±%
CPI(M)	Sarkar Murmu	42,781	44.33	
INC	Gopinath Murmu	29,210	30.27	
BJP	Jetha Hemrom	22,612	23.43	
BSP	Srinath Murmu	1,121	1.16	
Independent	Shibananda Soren	486	0.50	
Independent	Hopna Basra	287	0.30	
Majority		13,571	14.06	
Turnout		99,015	77.04	
CPI(M) hold		Swing		

=== 1987 ===
1987 West Bengal Legislative Assembly election: Habibpur (ST)
Party	Candidate	Votes	%	±%
CPI(M)	Sarkar Murmu	43,286	54.12	
INC	Moshi Charan Tudu	30,509	38.15	
Independent	Nimai Chand Murmu	6,186	7.73	
Majority		12,777	15.97	
Turnout		81,609	73.26	
CPI(M) hold		Swing		

=== 1982 ===
1982 West Bengal Legislative Assembly election: Habibpur (ST)
Party	Candidate	Votes	%	±%
CPI(M)	Sarkar Murmu	33,187	48.45	
INC	Mashi Charan Tudu	32,703	47.74	
Independent	Gopi Nath Soren	2,606	3.80	
Majority		484	0.71	
Turnout		70,420	73.51	
CPI(M) hold		Swing		

=== 1977 ===
1977 West Bengal Legislative Assembly election: Habibpur
Party	Candidate	Votes	%	±%
CPI(M)	Murmu Sarkar	16,509	45.18	
JP	Bobila Murmu	8,241	22.56	
INC	Joseph Tudu	5,830	15.96	
CPI	Sankar Murmu	5,047	13.81	
Independent	Gopinath Soren	910	2.49	
Majority		8,268	22.62	
Turnout		37,228	46.73	
Swing to CPI(M) from CPI		Swing		

=== 1972 ===
1972 West Bengal Legislative Assembly election: Habibpur
Party	Candidate	Votes	%	±%
CPI	Rabindra Nath Murmu	27,027	60.40	
CPI(M)	Sarkar Murmu	13,207	29.51	
Independent	Boila Murmu	4,514	10.09	
Majority		13,820	30.89	
Turnout		46,309	61.58	
Swing to CPI from Independent		Swing		

=== 1971 ===
1971 West Bengal Legislative Assembly election: Habibpur (ST)
Party	Candidate	Votes	%	±%
Independent	Sarkar Murmu	15,767	34.29	
INC	Boila Murmu	14,307	31.11	
INC(O)	Jahan Hemrom	7,183	15.62	
CPI	Sibnath Pramanik	6,383	13.88	
Bangla Congress	Rabindra Nath Hemrom	2,345	5.10	
Majority		1,460	3.18	
Turnout		50,486	67.53	
Swing to Independent from CPI		Swing		

=== 1969 ===
1969 West Bengal Legislative Assembly election: Habibpur
Party	Candidate	Votes	%	±%
CPI	Nimai Chand Murmu	21,938	47.14	
INC	Boila Murmu	21,904	47.07	
ABJS	Nimai Murmu	2,693	5.79	
Majority		34	0.07	
Turnout		48,068	67.51	
Swing to CPI from INC		Swing		

=== 1967 ===
1967 West Bengal Legislative Assembly election: Habibpur (ST)
Party	Candidate	Votes	%	±%
INC	B. Murmu	21,866	47.46	
CPI	N. C. Murmu	21,249	46.12	
SWA	C. Herom	2,960	6.42	
Majority		617	1.34	
Turnout		48,495	69.13	
Swing to INC from CPI		Swing		

=== 1962 ===
1962 West Bengal Legislative Assembly election: Habibpur
Party	Candidate	Votes	%	±%
CPI	Nimai Chand Murmu	22,367	59.43	
INC	Boila Murmu	14,068	37.38	
ABJS	Debendra Nath Tudu	1,203	3.20	
Majority		8,299	22.05	
Turnout		39,439	54.31	
CPI win (new seat)				
