= Maldaha Uttar Lok Sabha constituency =

Lok Sabha Constituency in West Bengal, India

Coordinates: 25°02′N 88°08′E

Maldaha Uttar WB-7
- Lok Sabha constituency
- Interactive Map Outlining Maldaha Uttar Lok Sabha Constituency

Constituency details
- Country: India
- Region: East India
- State: West Bengal
- Assembly constituencies: Habibpur; Gazole; Chanchal; Harishchandrapur; Malatipur; Ratua; Maldaha
- Established: 2009
- Total electors: 1,425,428
- Reservation: None

Member of Parliament
- 18th Lok Sabha
- Incumbent Khagen Murmu
- Party: BJP
- Alliance: NDA
- Elected year: 2024

Maldaha Uttar Lok Sabha constituency is one of the 543 parliamentary constituencies in India. All the seven assembly segments of No. 7 Maldaha Uttar Lok Sabha constituency are in Malda district of West Bengal. As per the order of the Delimitation Commission in respect of the delimitation of constituencies in the West Bengal, Malda Lok Sabha constituency ceased to exist from 2009 and two new ones came into being: Maldaha Uttar Lok Sabha constituency and Maldaha Dakshin Lok Sabha constituency.

== Assembly segments ==
Parliamentary constituencies in West Bengal - 1. Cooch Behar, 2. Alipurduars, 3. Jalpaiguri, 4. Darjeeling, 5. Raiganj, 6. Balurghat, 7. Maldaha Uttar, 8. Maldaha Dakshin, 9. Jangipur, 10. Baharampur, 11. Murshidabad, 12. Krishnanagar, 13. Ranaghat, 14. Bangaon, 15. Barrackpore, 16. Dum Dum, 17. Barasat, 18. Basirhat, 19. Jaynagar, 20. Mathurapur, 21. Diamond Harbour, 22. Jadavpur, 23. Kolkata Dakshin, 24. Kolkata Uttar, 25. Howrah, 26. Uluberia, 27. Serampore, 28. Hooghly, 29. Arambagh, 30. Tamluk, 31, Kanthi, 32. Ghatal, 33. Jhargram, 34. Medinipur, 35. Purulia, 36. Bankura, 37. Bishnupur, 38. Bardhaman Purba, 39. Bardhaman Durgapur, 40. Asansol, 41. Bolpur, 42. Birbhum

Maldaha Uttar Lok Sabha constituency (parliamentary constituency No. 7) is composed of the following assembly segments:

#	Name	District	Member	Party	2024 Lead
43	Habibpur (ST)	Malda	Joyel Murmu	BJP	BJP
44	Gazole (SC)	Malda	Chinmoy Deb Barman	BJP	BJP
45	Chanchal	Malda	Prasun Banerjee	AITC	INC
46	Harishchandrapur	Malda	Mohammad Matibur Rahaman	AITC	INC
47	Malatipur	Malda	Abdur Rahim Boxi	AITC	INC
48	Ratua	Malda	Samar Mukherjee	AITC	INC
50	Maldaha (SC)	Malda	Gopal Chandra Saha	BJP	BJP

== Members of Parliament ==
Year	Member	Party
Till 2008 : See Malda
2009	Mausam Noor	Indian National Congress
2014	Mausam Noor	Indian National Congress
2019	Khagen Murmu	Bharatiya Janata Party
2024	Khagen Murmu	Bharatiya Janata Party

== Election results ==
=== General election 2024 ===
2024 Indian general elections: Maldaha Uttar
Party	Candidate	Votes	%	±%
BJP	Khagen Murmu	527,023	37.18	▼0.43
AITC	Prasun Banerjee	4,49,315	31.70	▲0.31
INC	Mostaque Alam	3,84,764	27.14	▲4.61
NOTA	None of the above	7288	0.51	▼0.08
Majority		77,708	5.48	
Turnout		14,17,589	76.03	▼4.36
BJP hold		Swing		

=== General election 2019 ===
2019 Indian general election: Maldaha Uttar
Party	Candidate	Votes	%	±%
BJP	Khagen Murmu	509,524	37.61	+22.52
AITC	Mausam Noor	425,236	31.39	+14.42
INC	Isha Khan Choudhury	305,270	22.53	−10.88
CPI(M)	Bishwanath Ghosh	50,401	3.72	−24.05
Independent	Mohan Hasda	13,473	0.99	N/A
Independent	Al Manowara Begum	7,225	0.53	N/A
BMP	Manotam Hembram	5,985	0.44	+0.04
BSP	Nitish Kumar Mandal	6,347	0.47	−0.06
SS	Arjun Keshari	4,985	0.37	N/A
None of the Above	None of The Above	8,039	0.59	−0.15
Majority		84,288	6.22	
Turnout		1,355,367	80.39	−1.20
Registered electors		1,685,955		
BJP gain from INC		Swing	+16.70	

=== General election 2014 ===
2014 Indian general elections: Maldaha Uttar
Party	Candidate	Votes	%	±%
INC	Mausam Noor	388,609	33.41	−14.37
CPI(M)	Khagen Murmu	322,904	27.77	−13.48
AITC	Soumitra Roy	197,313	16.97	+16.97
BJP	Subhaskrishna Goswami	179,000	15.39	+8.71
SP	Milan Das	12,163	1.04	
SUCI(C)	Gautam Sarkar	8,988	0.77	
WPOI	Nurul Islam Majidi	7,128	0.61	
JDP	Imanuyel Hemram	6,805	0.58	
Independent	Suren Murmu	6,446	0.55	
BSP	Chittaranjan Kirttania	6,229	0.53	
BMP	Monatan Hembram	4,696	0.40	
AIUDF	Abdul Khaleque	4,650	0.39	
AMB	Bishnupada Barman	4,225	0.36	
Hindustan Krantikari Dal	Minara Khatun	3,348	0.28	
NOTA	None of the above	10,481	0.90	−−−
Majority		65,705	5.65	−0.88
Turnout		1,162,985	81.59	
INC hold		Swing		

=== General election 2009 ===
General Election, 2009: Maldaha Uttar
Party	Candidate	Votes	%	±%
INC	Mausam Noor	440,264	47.77	
CPI(M)	Sailen Sarkar	380,123	41.24	
BJP	Amlan Bhaduri	61,515	6.67	
BSP	Bikash Biswas	7,179	0.77	
RDMP	Monowara Begam	7,362	0.79	
Independent	Atul Chandra Mandal	5,998	0.65	
Independent	Asim Kumar Chowdhury	4,174	0.45	
Independent	Amina Khatun	4,841	0.52	
Independent	Mallika Sarkar (Nandy)	10,046	1.09	
Majority		60,141	6.52	
Turnout		921,531	83.69	
INC win (new seat)				

== See also ==
- List of constituencies of the Lok Sabha
