= English Bazar (disambiguation) =

English Bazar can be used for various places:

- English Bazar or Maldá, a metropolitan city in West Bengal, India.
  - English Bazar Municipality, the administration of Malda
- English Bazar (community development block), a community development block in the Malda district, West Bengal, India.
- English Bazar (Vidhan Sabha constituency), an electoral district covering Malda and other places, West Bengal, India.
