= Milki, West Bengal =

Milki
- Census Town
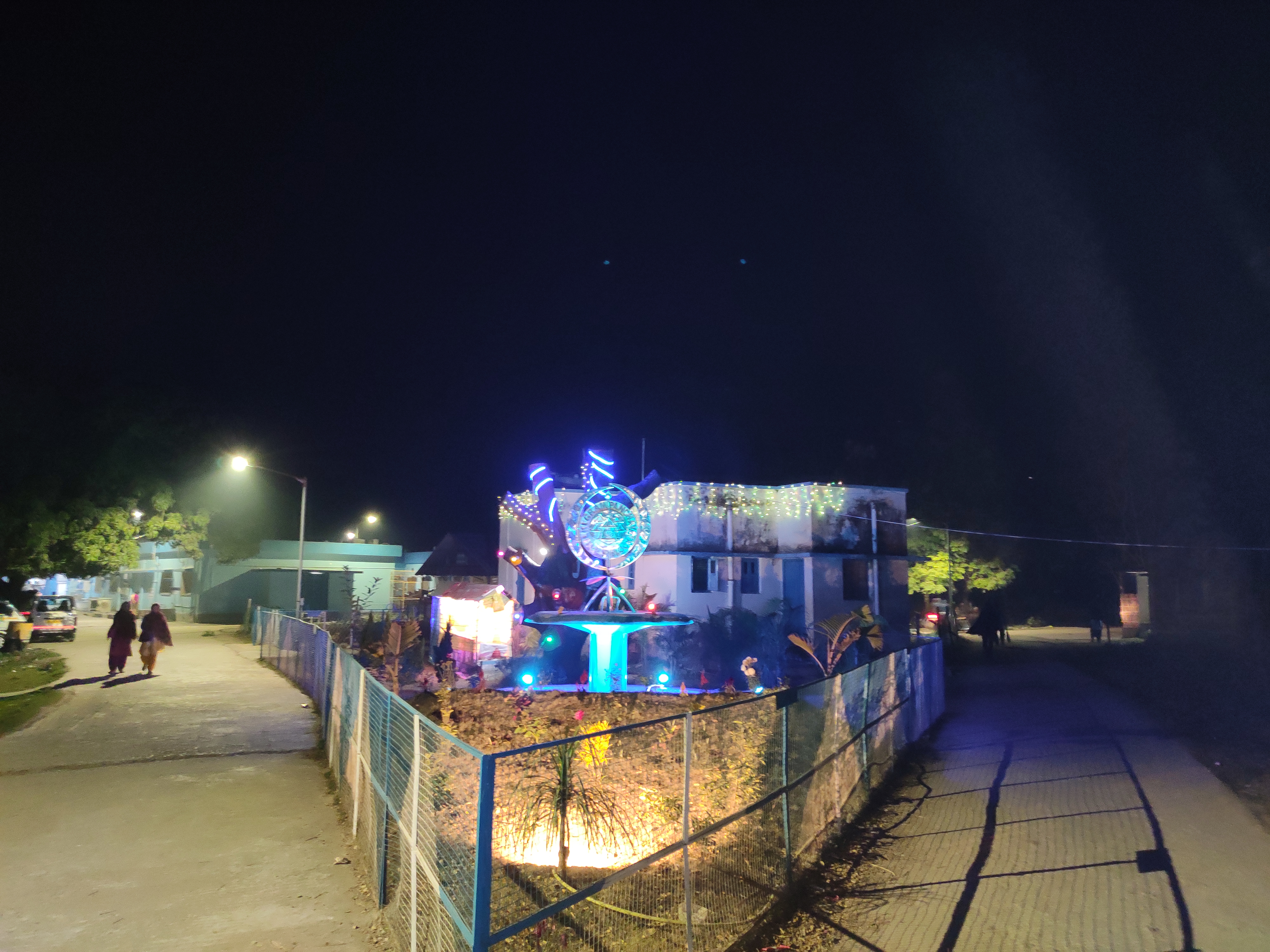
- Milki Town BPHC Park

- Location in West Bengal, India Milki (India) Milki (Asia)
- Coordinates: Town 25.0186°N 87.9999°E
- Country: India
- State: West Bengal
- District: Malda

Area
  - Total: 5.1009 km^{2} (1.9695 sq mi)
- Elevation: 30 m (98 ft)

Population (2011)
  - Total: 12,581
  - Density: 2,466.4/km^{2} (6,388.0/sq mi)

Languages
  - Official: Bengali
  - Additional official: English
- Time zone: UTC+5:30 (IST)
- Vehicle registration: WB
- Lok Sabha constituency: Maldaha Dakhsin
- Vidhan Sabha constituency: Manikchak
- Website: malda.nic.in

Milki is a census town in the English Bazar CD block in the Malda Sadar subdivision of Malda district in the Indian state of West Bengal.

== Geography ==
Cities, towns and locations in the southern portion of Malda district (including Kaliachak I, Kaliachak II, Kaliachak III, Manikchak and English Bazar CD blocks)
M: municipal town, CT: census town, R: rural/ urban centre, F: Facility, H: historical centre
Owing to space constraints in the small map, the actual locations in a larger map may vary slightly

=== Location ===
Milki is located at 25.0186°N 87.9999°E in the English Bazar (Community development block) of Malda district. The nearest railway station is Malda Town railway station which is 16 km away. The sub-district headquarters is located 15 km away in the English Bazar of Malda district. The district headquarters of Milki is Malda Sadar.

=== Area overview ===
The area shown in the adjoining map is the physiographic sub-region known as the diara. It “is a relatively well drained flat land formed by the fluvial deposition of newer alluvium.” The most note-worthy feature is the Farakka Barrage across the Ganges. The area is a part of the Malda Sadar subdivision, which is an overwhelmingly rural region, but the area shown in the map has pockets of urbanization with 17 census towns, concentrated mostly in the Kaliachak I CD block. The bank of the Ganges between Bhutni and Panchanandapur (both the places are marked on the map), is the area worst hit by left bank erosion, a major problem in the Malda area. The ruins of Gauda, capital of several empires, is located in this area.

Note: The map alongside presents some of the notable locations in the area. All places marked in the map are linked in the larger full screen map.

== Civic administration ==
Milki is administrated by Milki gram panchayat of the English Bazar Community development block of Malda district.

=== Police out post ===
Milki police outpost falls under the jurisdiction of the English Bazar police station.

== Demographics ==
According to the 2011 Census of India, Milki had a total population of 12,581, of which 6,528 (52%) were males and 6,053 (48%) were females. Population in the age range 0–6 years was 1,639. The total number of literate persons in Milki was 6,541 (59.78% of the population over 6 years).

Note: For information about language and religion see English Bazar CD block.

== Infrastructure ==
According to the District Census Handbook, Maldah, 2011, Milki covered an area of 5.1009 km^{2}. It had 4 km roads with open drains. The protected water-supply involved tap water from untreated sources, tube well/ bore well. It had 1,082 domestic electric connections. Among the medical facilities it had 1 hospital with 20 beds, 4 dispensaries/ health centres, 1 maternity and child welfare centre, 4 medicine shops. Among the educational facilities, it had 4 primary schools, 1 middle school, 1 secondary school, 1 senior secondary school in town, the nearest general degree college at Malda 17 km away. Among the social, cultural and recreational facilities it had 1 public library. It had branch offices of 2 nationalised banks, 1 cooperative bank.

== Market ==
Milki has a large market that sells car and vehicle garages. It is known for old car and car batteries.

== Healthcare ==
Milki Rural Hospital is the main medical facility in English Bazar CD Block, containing thirty beds.

== See also ==
- Sattari
- Sahazalalpur
