= Nihar Ranjan Ghosh =

Indian politician (born 1955)

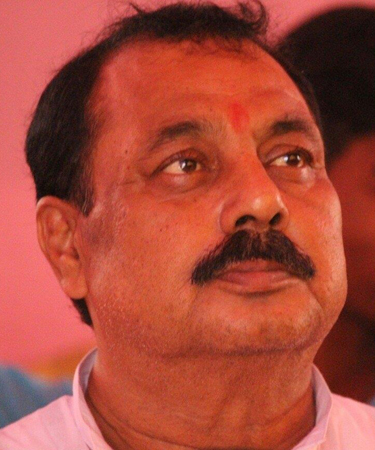

Former Chairman of English Bazar Municipality
- In office November 2017 – July 2021
- Preceded by: Krishnendu Narayan Choudhury
- Succeeded by: Sumala Agarwala

Member of the West Bengal Legislative Assembly
- In office 2 May 2021 – 4 May 2026
- Preceded by: Asif Mehbub
- Succeeded by: Prasun Banerjee
- Constituency: Chanchal
- In office 2016–2021
- Preceded by: Krishnendu Narayan Choudhury
- Succeeded by: Sreerupa Mitra Choudhury
- Constituency: English Bazar

Personal details
- Born: 11 August 1955 (age 71) Malda
- Party: All India Trinamool Congress (2017-present); Independent (2006-2017)
- Education: Akrumoni Coronation Institution (H.S)

Nihar Ranjan Ghosh (born 11 August 1955) is an Indian politician who currently serves as Member of Legislative Assembly from Chanchal constituency and also served as Member of Legislative Assembly from English Bazar constituency. He joined All India Trinamool Congress party in November 2017.

== Early life ==
Ghosh was born to Suresh Ghosh who was a middle class person in Malda district. Ghosh passed 12th from Akrumoni Coronation Institution.

== Political career ==
Ghosh is many times councillor in English Bazar Municipality as an Independent and his wife is also a councillor with his support. In 2016 West Bengal Legislative Assembly general election he won the English Bazar (Vidhan Sabha constituency) seat with support of CPIM and Congress as an Independent party candidate. In November 2016 he joined West Bengal ruling party All India Trinamool Congress (TMC) as proposed by TMC leader Mamata Banerjee.
