= Prasun Banerjee (politician) =

Indian politician in West Bengal

- প্রসূন বন্দ্যোপাধ্যায়

Member of the West Bengal Legislative Assembly
- Incumbent
- Assumed office 4 May 2026
- Preceded by: Nihar Ranjan Ghosh
- Constituency: Chanchal

Personal details
- Party: Trinamool Congress (until 2026); Democratic Trinamool Congress (from 2026)
- Spouse: Mammon Banarjee
- Parent: Khagendranath Bondopadhyay
- Education: Techno India University
- Occupation: Advocate
- Profession: Politician

Prasun Banerjee, also known as Prasun Bandyopadhyay, is an Indian politician, advocate and former Indian Police Service (IPS) officer [last served as Inspector General (IG) of the Raiganj range] from West Bengal.

He is a member of the West Bengal Legislative Assembly representing the Chanchal Assembly constituency and is affiliated with the All India Trinamool Congress.

== Early life and education ==
Banarjee is from Dakshin Dinajpur district of West Bengal. He has done Master of Laws (LL.M) from the Global Open University in the year of 2015. He is a Ph.D scholar under Department of Legal Studies in the Techno India University. He, along with his wife, is a partner of Juris Legal Solutions (a legal consultancy partnership firm).

== Career and politics ==
He is an IPS officer of the West Bengal cadre. Prior to entering active politics, he took voluntary retirement from service with the rank of Inspector General of Police (IGP) of the Raiganj Range with considerable service left.

During his policing career, he held several senior positions, including Superintendent of Police of South Dinajpur and Malda and also as range Deputy Inspector General of Barasat, Malda and Balurghat. He was also a part of the Special Investigating Team (SIT) that was formed by the Calcutta High Court to probe cases of post-poll violence in West Bengal.

In 2024, Banerjee contested the Lok Sabha election from the Malda Uttar constituency as a candidate of the All India Trinamool Congress. Following the election, he was appointed Legal Advisor to the Directorate of West Bengal Police.

Apart from his careers in public service and politics, Banerjee has been associated with the Bengali entertainment industry as an actor and filmmaker, appearing in Bengali films and television productions, including Desher Maati.

Banerjee has also been associated with independent filmmaking. He co-directed a documentary that was officially selected for the Dadasaheb Phalke Film Festival. Another film directed by him is available for streaming on Addatimes and was selected for screening at the London Film Festival.

=== Electoral performance ===
West Bengal Legislative Assembly
Year	Constituency	Party	Votes	%	Opponent	Party	Votes	%	Margin	Result
2026	Chanchal	AITC	1,28,014	54.61	Ratan Das	BJP	63,874	27.36	63,874	Won

== See also ==
- 2026 West Bengal Legislative Assembly election
- List of chief ministers of West Bengal
- West Bengal Legislative Assembly
