= Amlan Bhaduri =

Indian politician

Chairman, English Bazar Municipality
- Incumbent
- Assumed office 2026
- Preceded by: Krishnendu Narayan Choudhury

Member of the West Bengal Legislative Assembly
- Incumbent
- Assumed office 2026
- Preceded by: Sreerupa Mitra Chaudhury
- Constituency: English Bazar

Councillor, English Bazar Municipality
- Incumbent
- Assumed office 2010
- Constituency: Ward no. 13

Personal details
- Party: Bharatiya Janata Party (2020-present)
- Other political affiliations: All India Trinamool Congress (2015-2020); Bharatiya Janata Party (till 2015)
- Profession: Politician

Amlan Bhaduri is an Indian politician and member of the Bharatiya Janata Party. He was elected as a Member of the West Bengal Legislative Assembly from the English Bazar constituency in the 2026 West Bengal Legislative Assembly election. Besides, he has also been elected as the chairman of the English Bazar Municipality.
