= Krishnendu Narayan Choudhury =

Indian advocate and politician

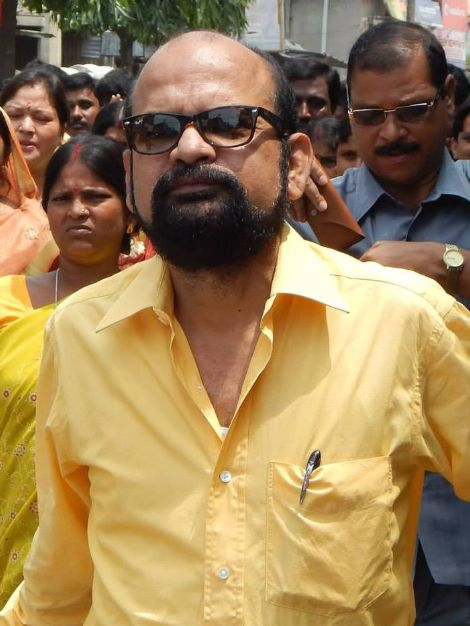
- Chowdhury in 2018

Chairman of English Bazar Municipality
- In office 30 March 2022 – 2026
- Preceded by: Nihar Ranjan Ghosh, Sumala Agarwala
- Succeeded by: Amlan Bhaduri

Cabinet Minister, Government of West Bengal
- In office 2013–2016
- Governor: Keshari Nath Tripathi
- Minister of: Tourism
- Chief Minister: Mamata Banerjee
- Succeeded by: Bratya Basu

Minister of Food processing and Horticulture
- In office 2014–2016

Member of West Bengal Legislative Assembly
- In office 11 May 2006 — 20 May 2016
- Preceded by: Samar Ray
- Succeeded by: Nihar Ranjan Ghosh
- Constituency: English Bazar

State General Secretary of All India Trinamool Congress
- Incumbent
- Assumed office 16 August 2021

Personal details
- Born: 17 August 1958 (age 68) Malda, West Bengal, India
- Party: Trinamool Congress (1998–2006, 2013–present); Indian National Congress (1974–1998, 2006–2013)
- Spouse: Kakali Choudhury
- Education: University of Calcutta (L.L.B)
- Profession: Lawyer

Krishnendu Narayan Choudhury (born 17 August 1957) is an Indian advocate and politician who is the Chairman of English Bazar Municipality. He has been the Cabinet Minister of Tourism and Minister of Food processing and Horticulture from West Bengal. He was former MLA from English Bazar and State General Secretary of All India Trinamool Congress.

== Introduction ==
Krishnendu Narayan Choudhury, son of Manindra Narayan Choudhury, was born in 1958 in a well known jamindar family of Malda District. He is BA and LLB from Calcutta University.

== Political forays ==
He started his political journey in 1974 with Congress. After several years he left Congress in 1998 and joined Trinamool Congress, but returned to Congress in 2006. He subsequently rejoined Trinamool Congress in 2013.

== Electoral achievements ==
He had won the English Bazar seat in 2006 and 2011 as a Congress candidate. After switching over to Trinamool Congress the second time, he won a by-election in 2013 from the same constituency.

== Ministerial berths ==
He initially joined the Council of Ministers of West Bengal as tourism minister in 2013 and was shifted to food processing and horticulture department in 2014.

He was also Chairman of English Bazar municipality for several years in subsequent terms in 1995, 2000, 2010 and 2015.
