= Sreerupa Mitra Chaudhury =

Indian politician (born 1964)

Sreerupa Mitra Choudhury

Member of the West Bengal Legislative Assembly
- In office 2 May 2021. – 4 May 2026
- Preceded by: Nihar Ranjan Ghosh
- Succeeded by: Amlan Bhaduri
- Constituency: English Bazar, Malda

Chairperson of National Institute for Gender Justice
- In office 2014–2016

Chairman of Special Task Force (India) on Rape, Trafficking & Violence Against Women
- In office December 2012 – December 2013

President of NGO Sudinalay
- In office 2010–2013

National Advisor of National Legal Services Authority of the Ministry of Law and Justice (India)
- In office 2008–2010

Personal details
- Born: 18 April 1964 (age 62)
- Party: Bharatiya Janata Party
- Spouse: Ram Krishna Mitra
- Education: University of North Bengal (M.A)

Sreerupa Mitra Chaudhury (born 18 April 1964), popularly known as Nirbhaya Didi, is an Indian politician and a member of Bharatiya Janata Party from West Bengal, India. She is also a social worker, women's rights activist and former journalist.

== Personal life ==
Sreerupa Mitra Chaudhury hails from South Baluchar Battla in Malda district of West Bengal. She is a Post Graduate and did her Master of Arts from North Bengal University in 1987. She is married to Ram Krishna Mitra.

== Career ==
In 2004 she took part in the launching of the National Legal Literacy Mission. As of 2008 she served as national advisor of the National Legal Services Authority of the Ministry of Law and Justice. As of 2010 she was the president of the NGO Sudinalay.

Known as Nirbhaya Didi in Kolkata, she was involved with the process of rehabilitation of rape victims and providing toilets to women. She chaired the special task force on rape, trafficking and violence against women set up by the Prime Minister Manmohan Singh after the 2012 Delhi gang rape. She resigned from this post in December 2013, amidst speculations that she could have run for parliament from the Malda seat as an All India Trinamool Congress candidate.

Chaudhury was named as the candidate of the All India Trinamool Congress got 803 votes in the South Delhi Lok Sabha seat in the 2014 general election. In 2019, Lok Sabha election, she contested from Maldaha Dakshin seat with a Bharatiya Janata Party ticket. But lost to Abu Hasem Khan Choudhury by a small margin.

In the 2021 West Bengal Legislative Assembly election, Chaudhury contested as a Bharatiya Janata Party candidate from English Bazar and won the seat by defeating her nearest rival from TMC.
