= Chanchal Assembly constituency =

Chanchal
- Constituency No. 45 for the West Bengal Legislative Assembly
- Interactive Map Outlining Chanchal Assembly Constituency

Constituency details
- Country: India
- Region: East India
- State: West Bengal
- District: Malda
- Lok Sabha constituency: Maldaha Uttar
- Established: 2011
- Total electors: 249,402
- Reservation: None

Member of Legislative Assembly
- 18th West Bengal Legislative Assembly
- Incumbent Prasun Banerjee
- Party: Democratic Trinamool Congress
- Elected year: 2026

Chanchal Assembly constituency is an assembly constituency in Malda district in the Indian state of West Bengal.

== Overview ==
As per orders of the Delimitation Commission, No. 45 Chanchal Assembly constituency covers Chanchal I community development block and Barui, Kusidha, Rashidabad and Tulsihatta gram panchayats of Harishchandrapur I community development block.

Chanchal Assembly constituency is part of No. 7 Maldaha Uttar (Lok Sabha constituency).

== Members of the Legislative Assembly ==
Year	Name	Party
2011	Asif Mehbub	Indian National Congress
2016	Asif Mehbub	Indian National Congress
2021	Nihar Ranjan Ghosh	Trinamool Congress
2026	Prasun Banerjee	Trinamool Congress

For MLAs from the area in previous years see Kharba Assembly constituency

== Election results ==
=== 2026 ===
|percentage=5.77|change=}}

2026 West Bengal Legislative Assembly election: Chanchal
Party	Candidate	Votes	%	±%
AITC	Prasun Banerjee	128,014	54.61	−3.47
BJP	Ratan Das	64,140	27.36	+3.01
INC	Asif Mehbub	16,336	6.97	−8.73
CPI(M)	Anwarul Hoque	13,522	5.77	
Independent	Anjarul Hoque	6,619	2.82	
Independent	Abdul Khaleque	988	0.42	
BSP	Younish Mia	890	0.38	
WPOI	Mastar Shahjahan Ali	711	0.30	
AJUP	MD Masiur Rahaman	645	0.28	
SUCI(C)	Jhantu Kumar Rabidas	527	0.22	
Independent	Munna Thakur	523	0.22	
Independent	Abdul Bari	469	0.20	
Rastriya Aam Jan Seva Party	Bhakta Prasad Saha	244	0.10	
NOTA	None of the above	781	0.33	−0.18
Majority		63,874	27.25	−6.48
Turnout		234,409	95.8	+15.74
AITC hold		Swing		

=== 2021 ===
2021 West Bengal Legislative Assembly election: Chanchal
Party	Candidate	Votes	%	±%
AITC	Nihar Ranjan Ghosh	115,966	58.08	
BJP	Dipankar Ram	48,628	24.35	
INC	Asif Mehbub	31,346	15.7	
NOTA	None of the above	1,023	0.51	
Majority		67,338	33.73	
Turnout		199,679	80.06	
AITC gain from INC		Swing		

=== 2011 ===
In the 2011 election, Asif Mehbub of Congress defeated his nearest rival Anjuman Ara Begum of CPI(M).

West Bengal assembly elections, 2011: Chanchal constituency
Party	Candidate	Votes	%	±%
INC	Asif Mehbub	68,586	48.69	
CPI(M)	Anjuman Ara Begam	54,399	38.62	
BJP	Sital Prasad Chakraborty	11,002	7.81	
Independent	Jayanta Kumar Sinha	2,867		
Independent	Abdul Khaleque	2,405		
BSP	Dally Choudhury Roy	1,593		
Turnout		140,852	82.33	
