= Sattari, West Bengal =

Village in West Bengal, India

Sattari
- Village
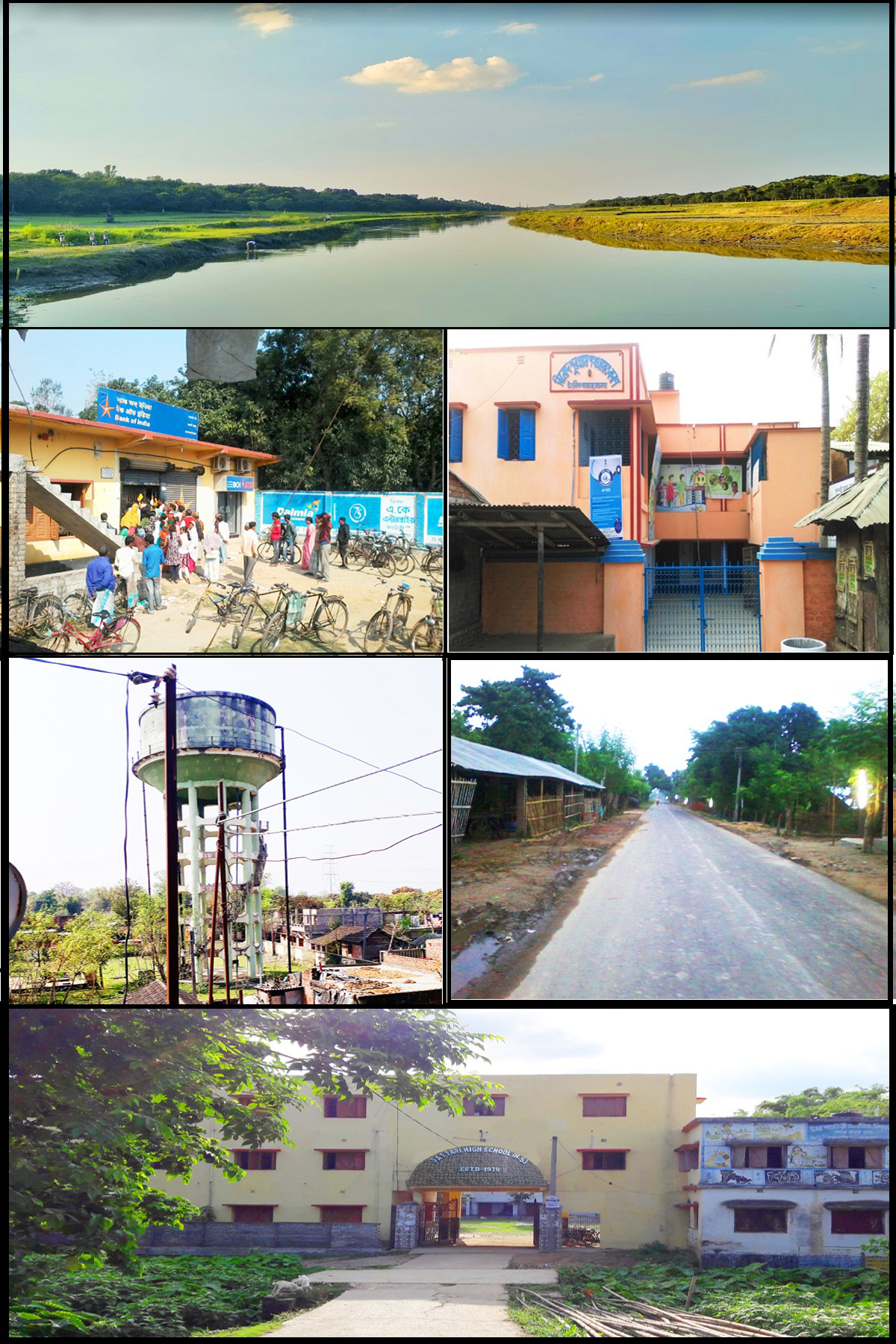
- Sattari View
- Nickname: Mango City
- Location in West Bengal, India
- Coordinates: 24.9934°N 88.0380°E
- Country: India
- State: West Bengal
- District: Malda
- Police station: English Bazar
- Railway Station: Malda Town railway station
- Sub-Divisional Magistrate: Malda Sadar subdivision
- Block: English Bazar (community development block)

Government
  - Type: Panchayati raj (India)
  - Body: Binodpur Gram Panchayat
  - Pradhan: Raju Mia
  - Deputy Pradhan: Mukbel Mia

Area
  - Total: 2.36 km^{2} (0.91 sq mi)
  - Rank: 32nd
- Elevation: 17 m (56 ft)

Population (2011 census)
  - Total: 10,538
  - Rank: 4th in E.B Block
  - Density: 4,465/km^{2} (11,560/sq mi)
- Demonym: Sattaria

Languages
  - Official: Bengali
  - Additional official: English

Food
  - Main: Fish Rice
- Time zone: UTC+5:30 (IST)
- PIN: 732208
- Post Office: Sattari B.O
- Telephone code: 913512
- ISO 3166 code: IN-WB
- Vehicle registration: WB-65,66
- Major Highway: NH 81
- Mouza J.L No.: Sattari (011)
- Sex ratio: 5458 : 5080 (2011 census) ♂/♀
- Lok Sabha constituency: Maldaha Dakshin
- Vidhan Sabha constituency: English Bazar (Vidhan Sabha constituency)
- Mosque/ Worship: Sattari Jame Masjid
- School: Sattari High School
- Website: malda.nic.in

Sattari is a village in Malda district of the state of West Bengal, India. Sattari is known for producing mango (aam) supply, lace (gamchha), and carpet work. It is the headquarters of Binodpur Gram Panchayat (village council) on which it is represented by 6 of the 13 seats.

== Geography ==
Cities, towns and locations in the southern portion of Malda district (including Kaliachak I, Kaliachak II, Kaliachak III, Manikchak and English Bazar CD blocks)
M: municipal town, CT: census town, R: rural/ urban centre, F: Facility, H: historical centre
Owing to space constraints in the small map, the actual locations in a larger map may vary slightly

=== Location ===
Sattari is located at 24.9937°N 88.0400°E the English Bazar tehsil (transl. administrative unit) or community development block of Maldah district in West Bengal, India. It is situated 14.4 kilometres (8.9 mi) from sub-district headquarter Malda and 15.1 kilometres (9.4 mi) from the district headquarters of the English Bazar. It is at the border of English Bazar and Mothabari on the Pagla River, a tributary of the Ganges.

=== Area overview ===
The area shown in the adjoining map is the physiographic sub-region known as the diara. It “is a relatively well drained flat land formed by the fluvial deposition of newer alluvium.” The most note-worthy feature is the Farakka Barrage across the Ganges. The area is a part of the Malda Sadar subdivision, which is an overwhelmingly rural region, but the area shown in the map has pockets of urbanization with 17 census towns, concentrated mostly in the Kaliachak I CD block. The bank of the Ganges between Bhutni and Panchanandapur (both the places are marked on the map), is the area worst hit by left bank erosion, a major problem in the Malda area. The ruins of Gauda, capital of several empires, is located in this area.

Note: The map alongside presents some of the notable locations in the area. All places marked in the map are linked in the larger full screen map.

== Weather ==
=== Climate ===
The accurate weather of Sattari is normally to other places in West Bengal, with a tropical climate, specifically a tropical wet and dry climate(Aw) under the Köppen climate classification, with seven months of dryness and peak of rains in July to October.The cooler season from December to February is followed by the summer season from March to June.RealFeel®: 34° Winds: 7 km/h SEGusts: 11 km/h Humidity: 88%Dew Point: 26° UVIndex: 0(Low)Cloud Cover: 99% Rain: 2 mmSnow: 0 CM Ice: 0mmVisibility: 6 km Ceiling: 9144 mWet Bulb: 27°

== Demographics ==
As of 2011 Indian Census, Sattari had a total population of 10,538, of which 5,458 were males and 5,080 were females, with a sex ratio of 930. Population within the age group of 0 to 6 years was 1,575. The total number of literates in Sattari was 4,977, which constituted 47.2% of the population with male literacy of 52.9% and female literacy of 41.1%. The effective literacy rate of 7+ population of Sattari was 55.5%, of which male literacy rate was 62.0% and female literacy rate was 48.5%. The Scheduled Castes population was 3,043. Sattari had 2318 households in 2011.

== Administration ==
Sattari village is administrated by Binodpur Gram Panchayat (transl. Bindopur village council) of the English Bazar community development block of Malda district. Sattari is the headquarters of the village council and is represented by six of the thirteen seats; four are Muslim and two are Hindu. Sattari falls under the jurisdiction of the English Bazar Police Station.Sattari's four peoples nabs by NIA from Kolkata for possession of fake currency.

Part and seat name
Part name	Part no.	Type
Natunpara	Part-IX/9	Most Rural
Jarlahipara, Bazarpara	Part-X/10	Rural
Masjidpara	Part-XI/11	Rural
Basantapur, Nimtala	Part-XII/12	Rural
Nagarpara, Tiarpara, Helupara	Part-XIII/13	Rural
Puratan Choudhurypara, Natun Choudhurypara, Khatiyatanga	Part-XIV/14	Rural
Titipara, Dakshin Chandipur	Part-XV/15	Rural
Kagmari Hatpara	Part-XVI/16	Rural

== Festivals ==
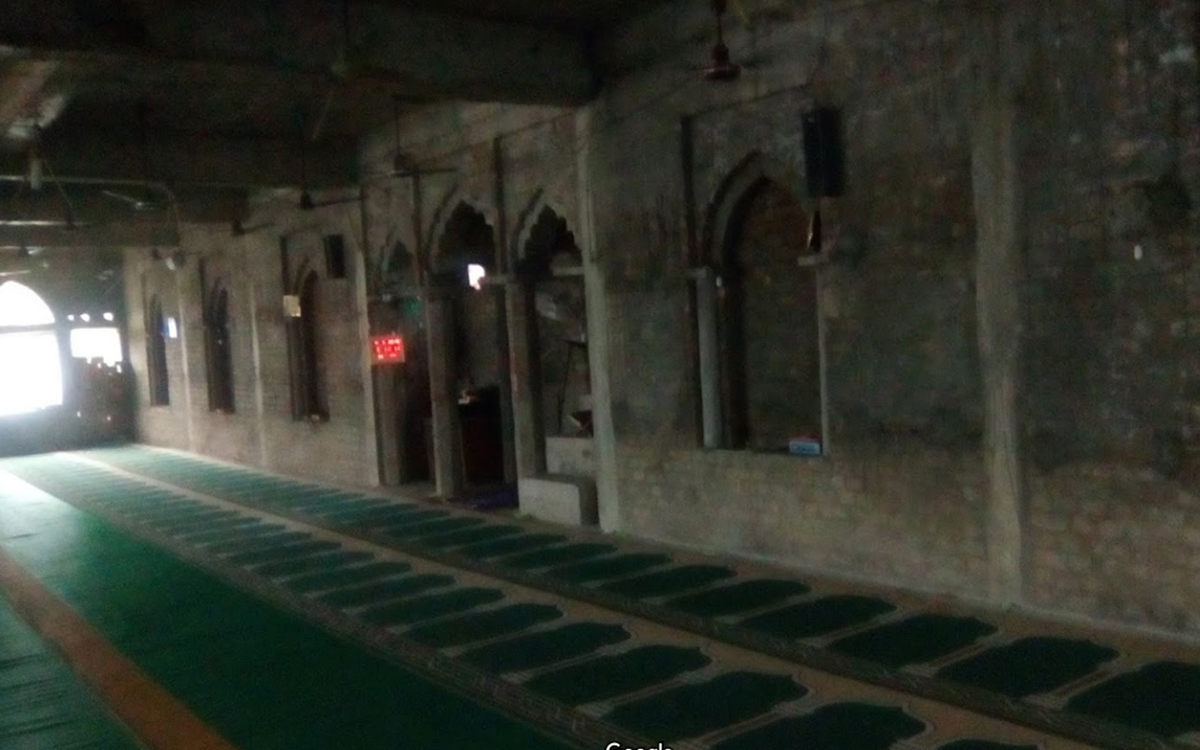
The Sattari Jame Mosque

Almost all of the major religious festivals are celebrated, like

- Durga puja
- Kali Puja
- Diwali
- Eid al-Fitr
- Eid al-Adha
- Muharram
- Milad un-Nabi
- Shab-e-Barat
- Ratha-Yatra
- Maha Shivratri

=== Fairs ===
Some of the mostly reputed cultural fairs of the town are .

- Eid Fair, at Sattari Eid Gah Field
- Muharram Fair, at Sattari Karbala Maidan
- Kali Puja Fair, at Kagmari Bridge

=== Places of interest ===
- Binodpur Gram Panchayat

== Education ==
Sattari High School is a Bengali-medium coeducational institution established in 1971. It has facilities for teaching from class V to class XII. It has a playground, a library with 2050 books, and 10 computers for teaching and learning purposes.

== Transport ==
Taxi cabs and buses are the best way to get around this city, with public and private bus service available within the town. There are options to rent cars and bicycles. Malda Town railway station is 15.5 kilometres (9.6 mi) away, and there are no local trains.

== Gallery ==
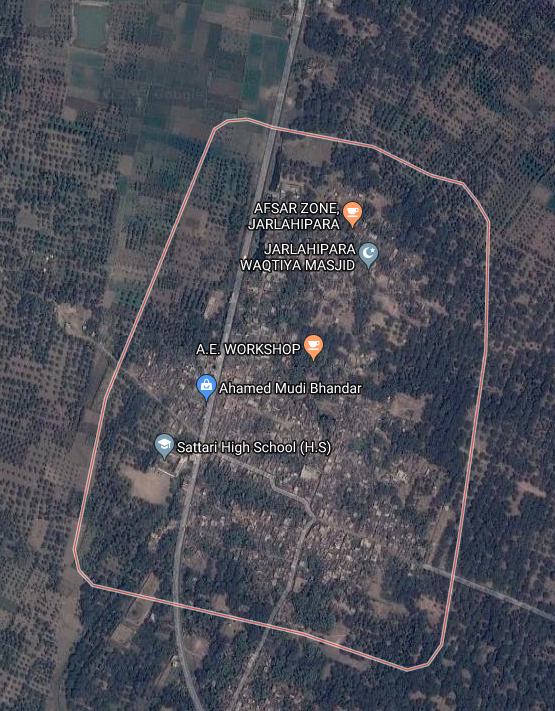
Sattari Satellite view on Google Map

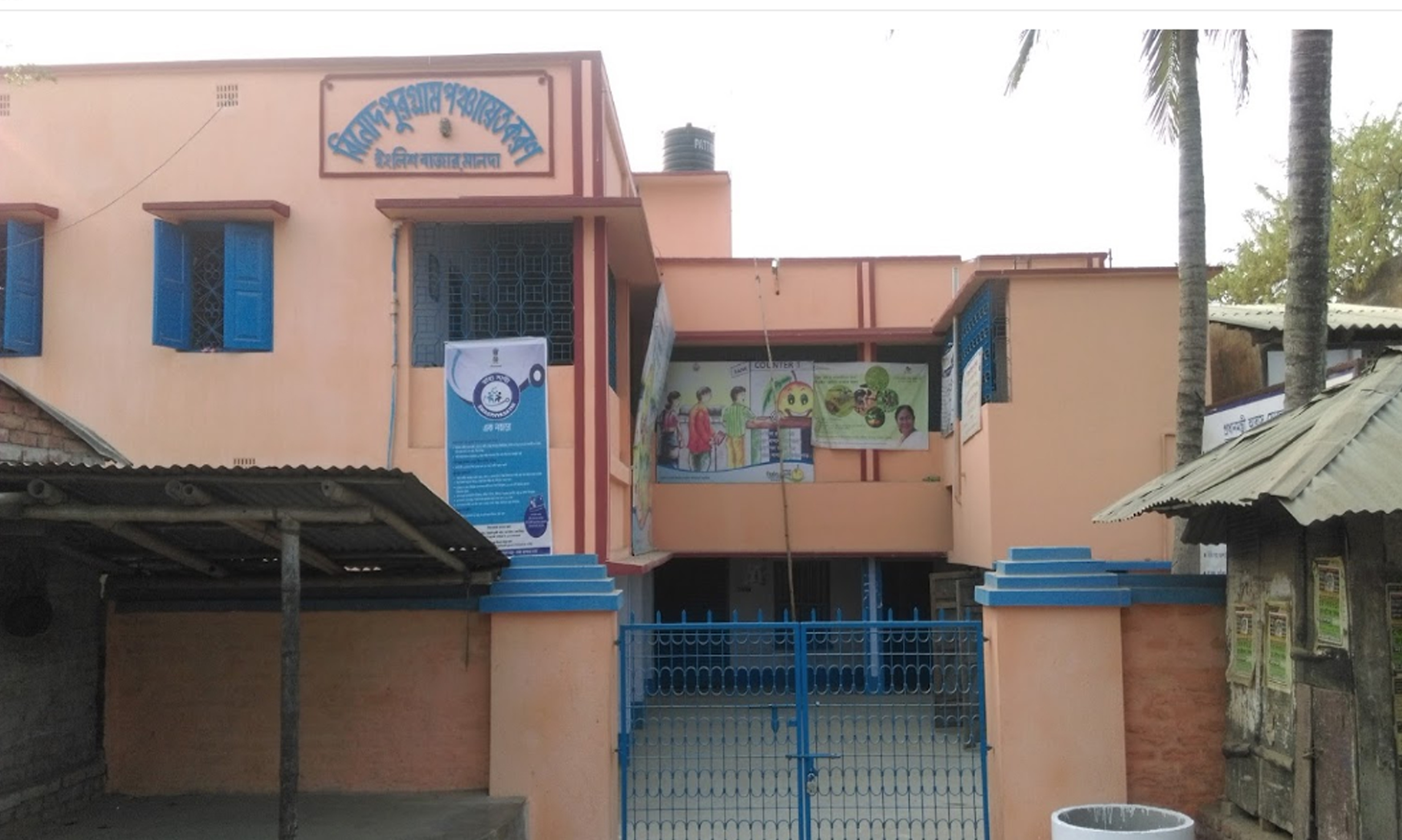
Gram Panchayat Building, Sattari

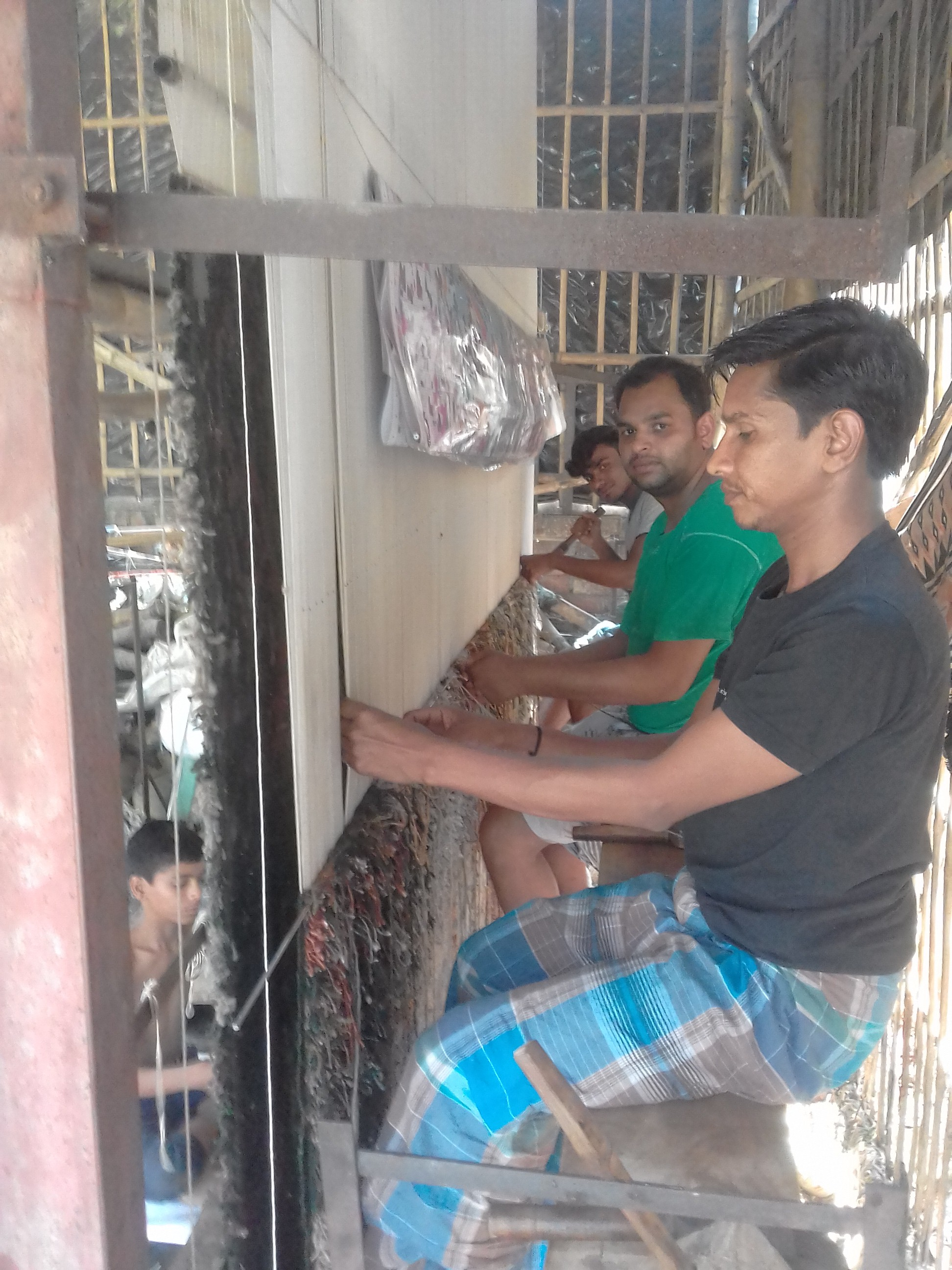
Sattari carpet work

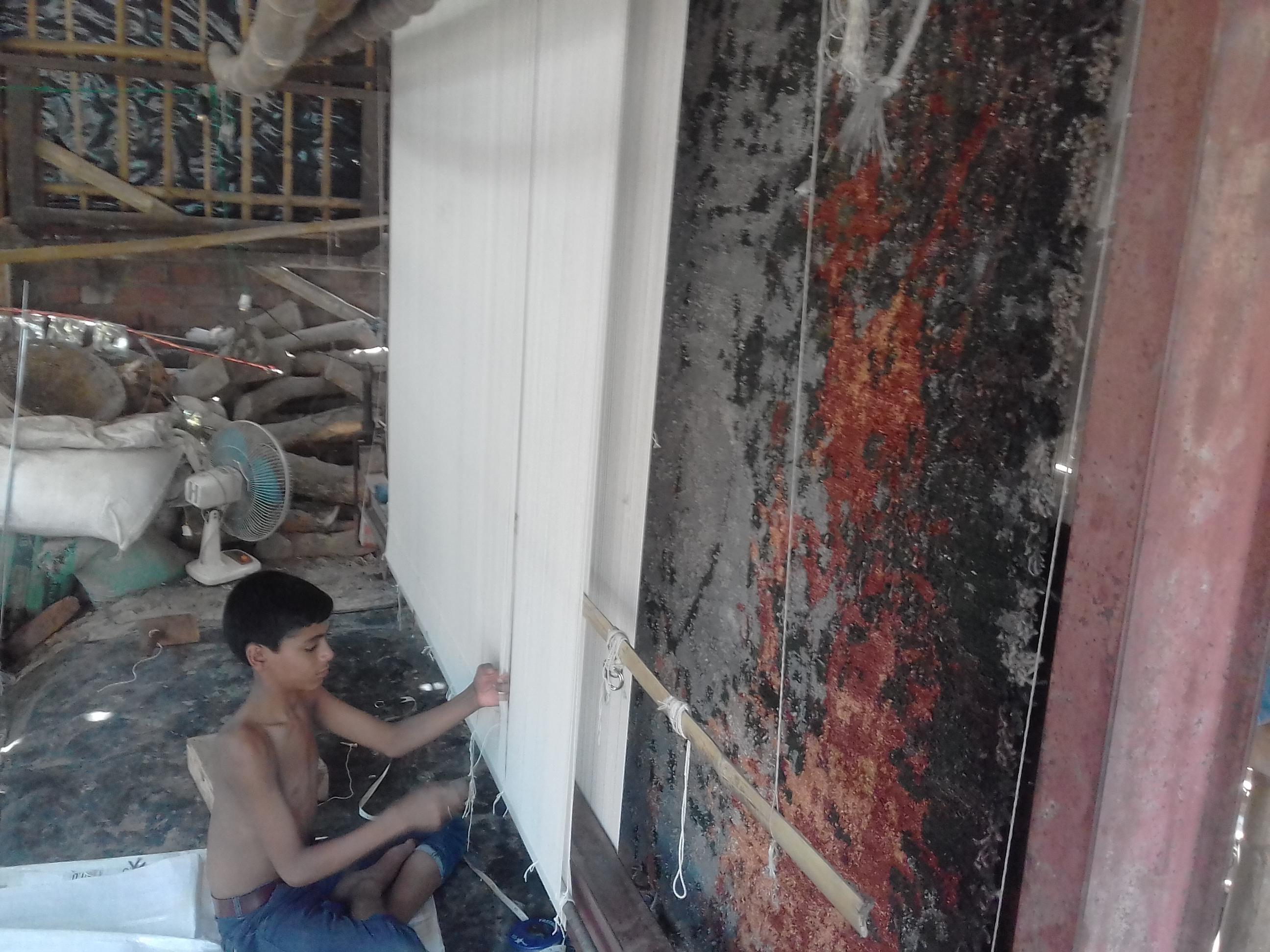
Sattari carpet work

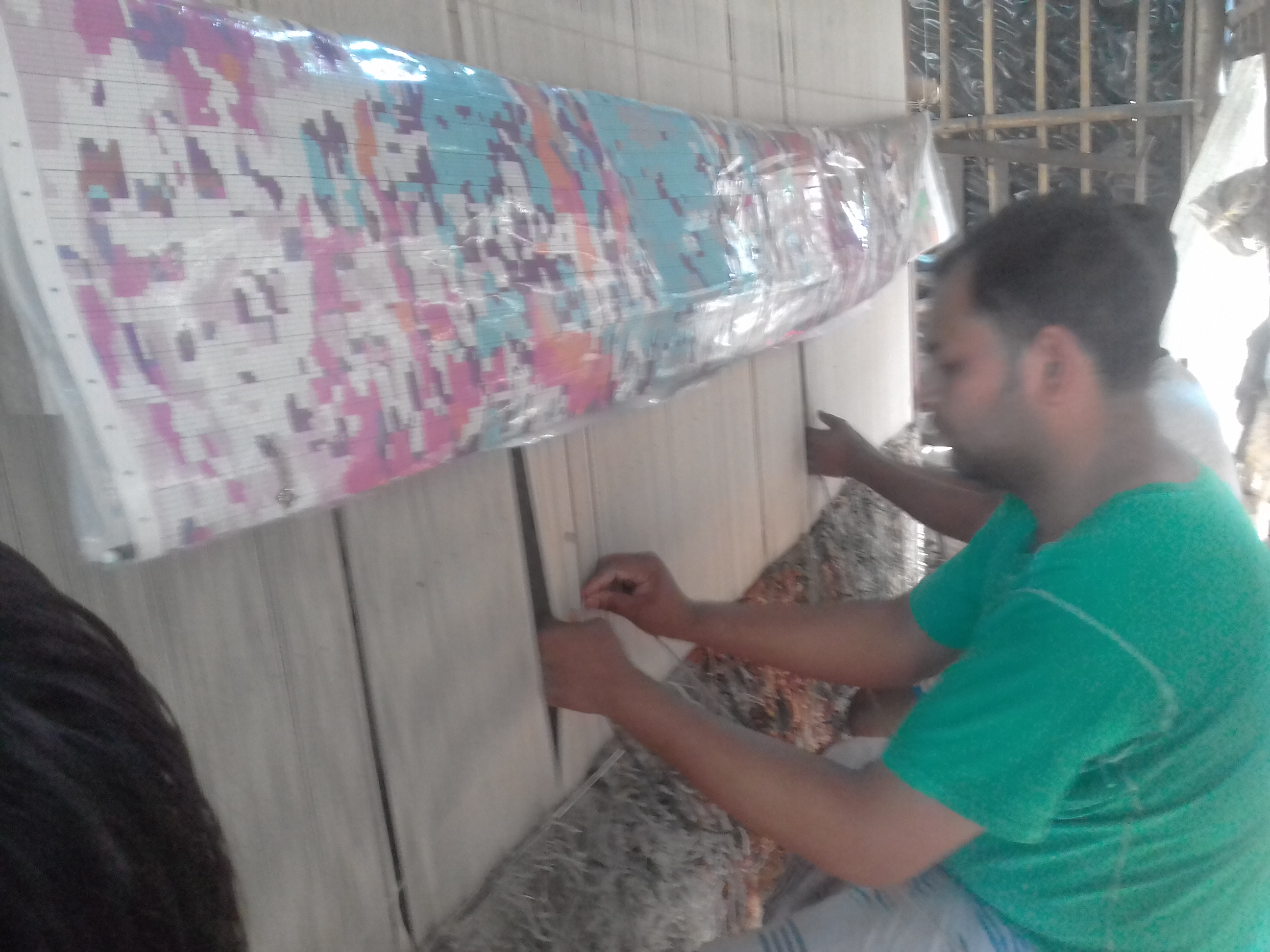
Sattari carpet work

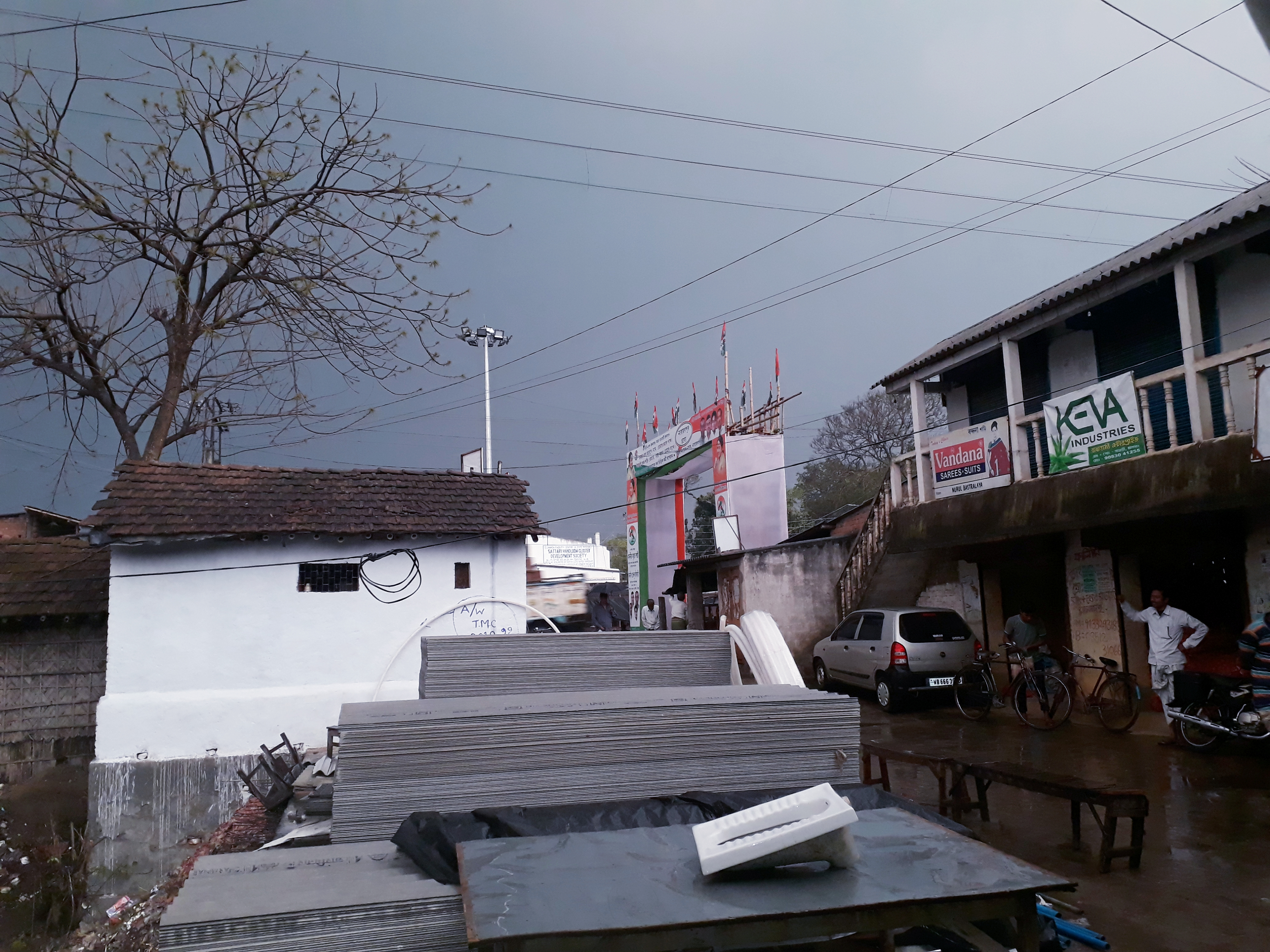
Shop and market parking place

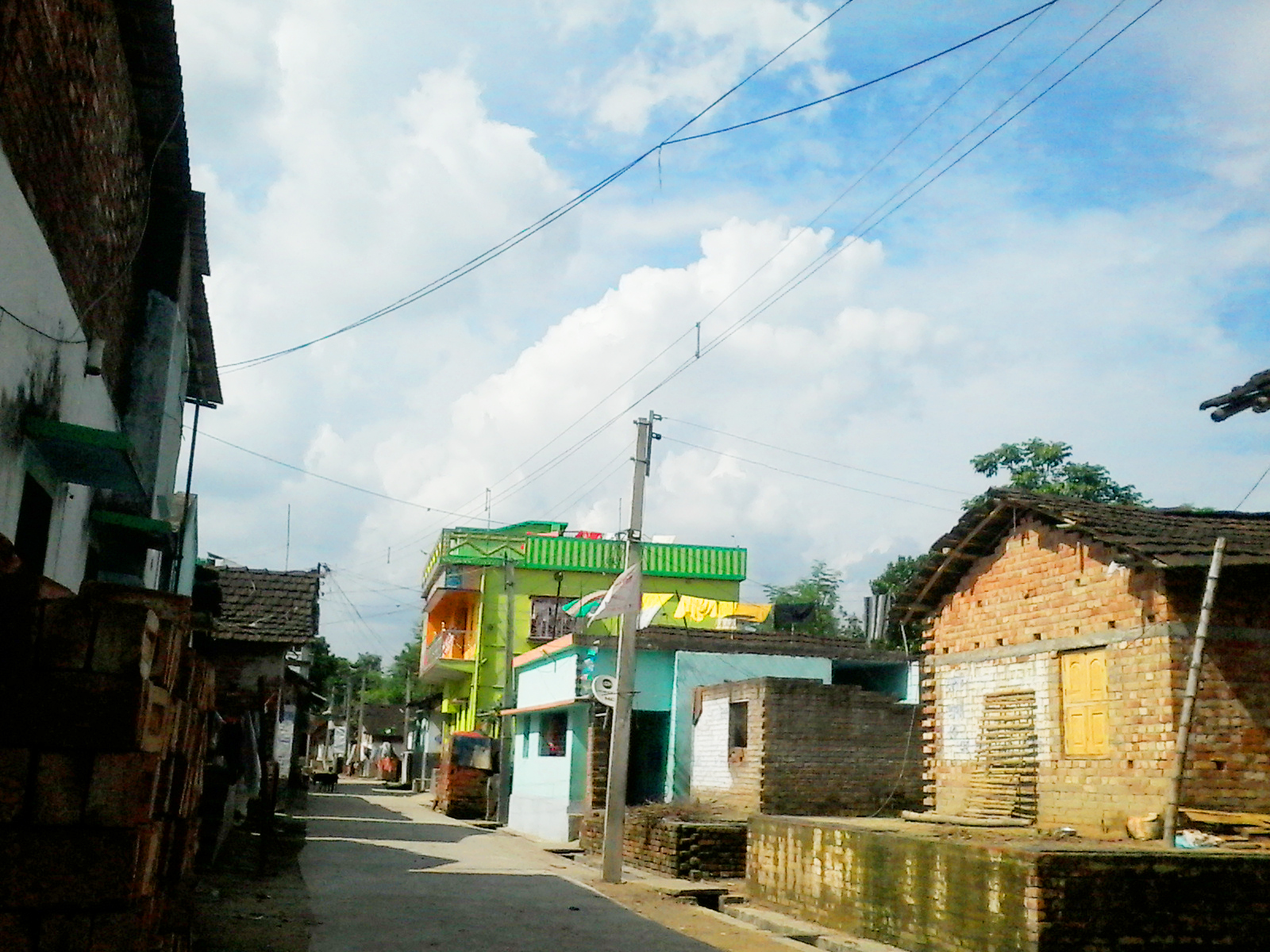
Sattari Village interior Natunpara

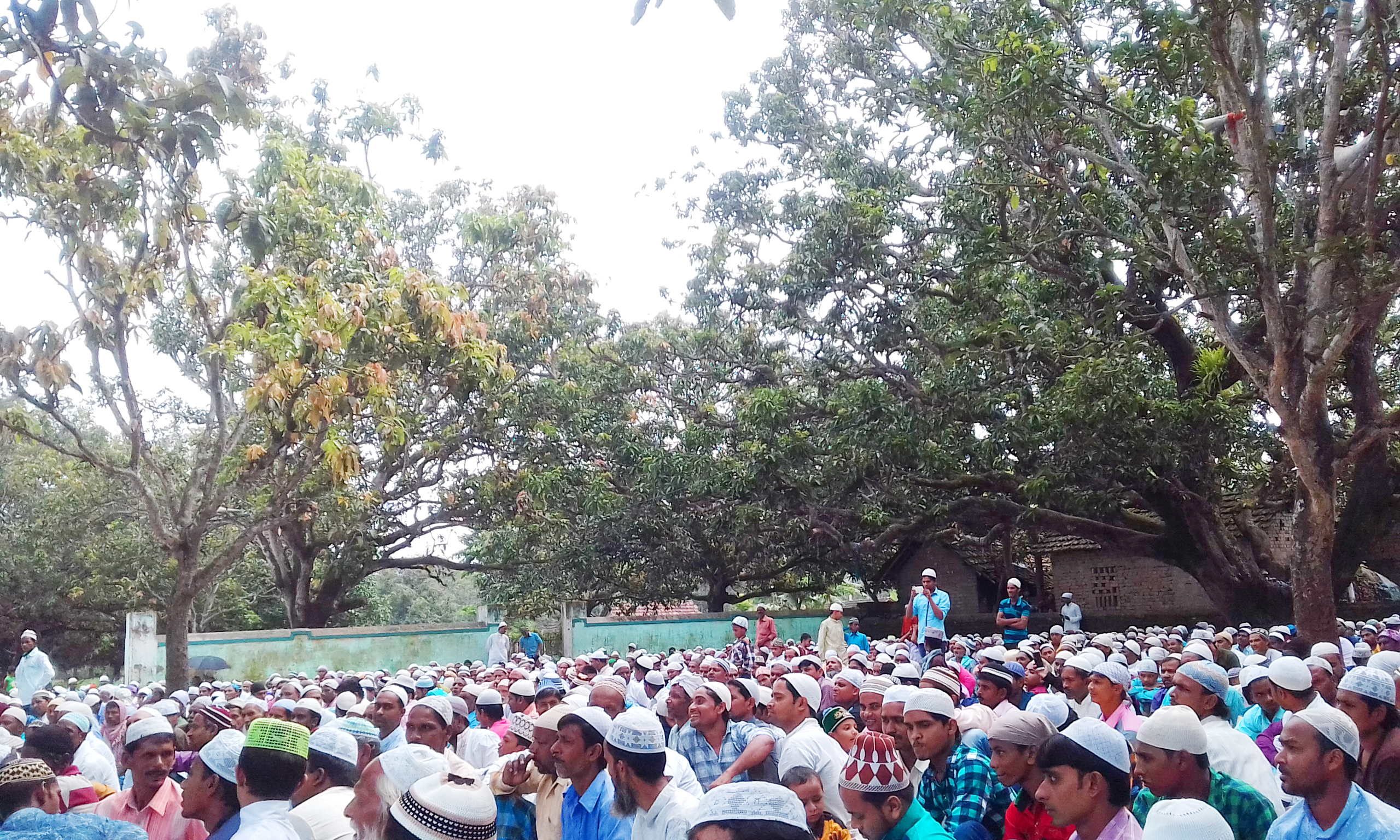
Sattari Eid Ul-fiter Jamad

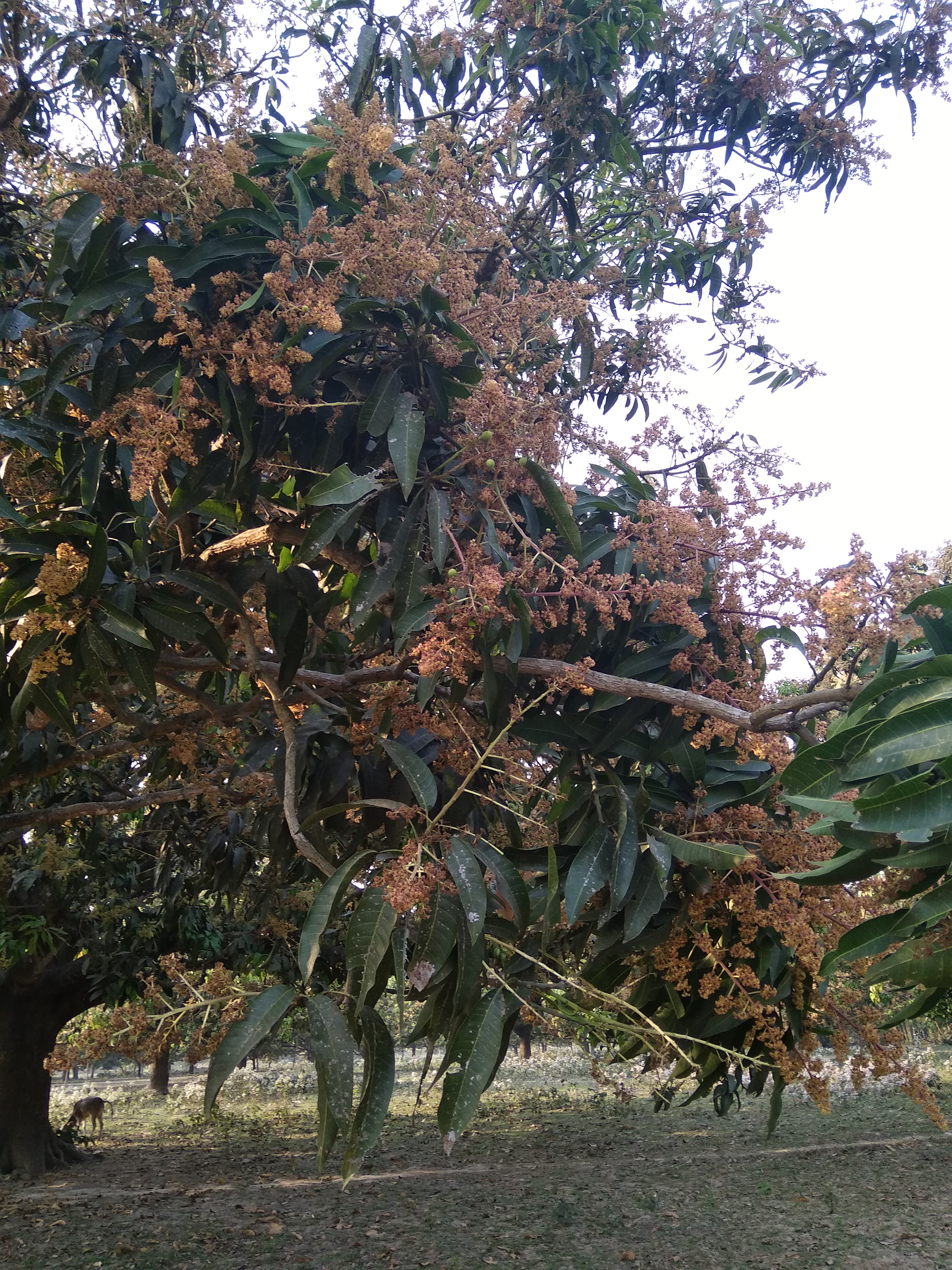
Sattari Mango Tree Garden

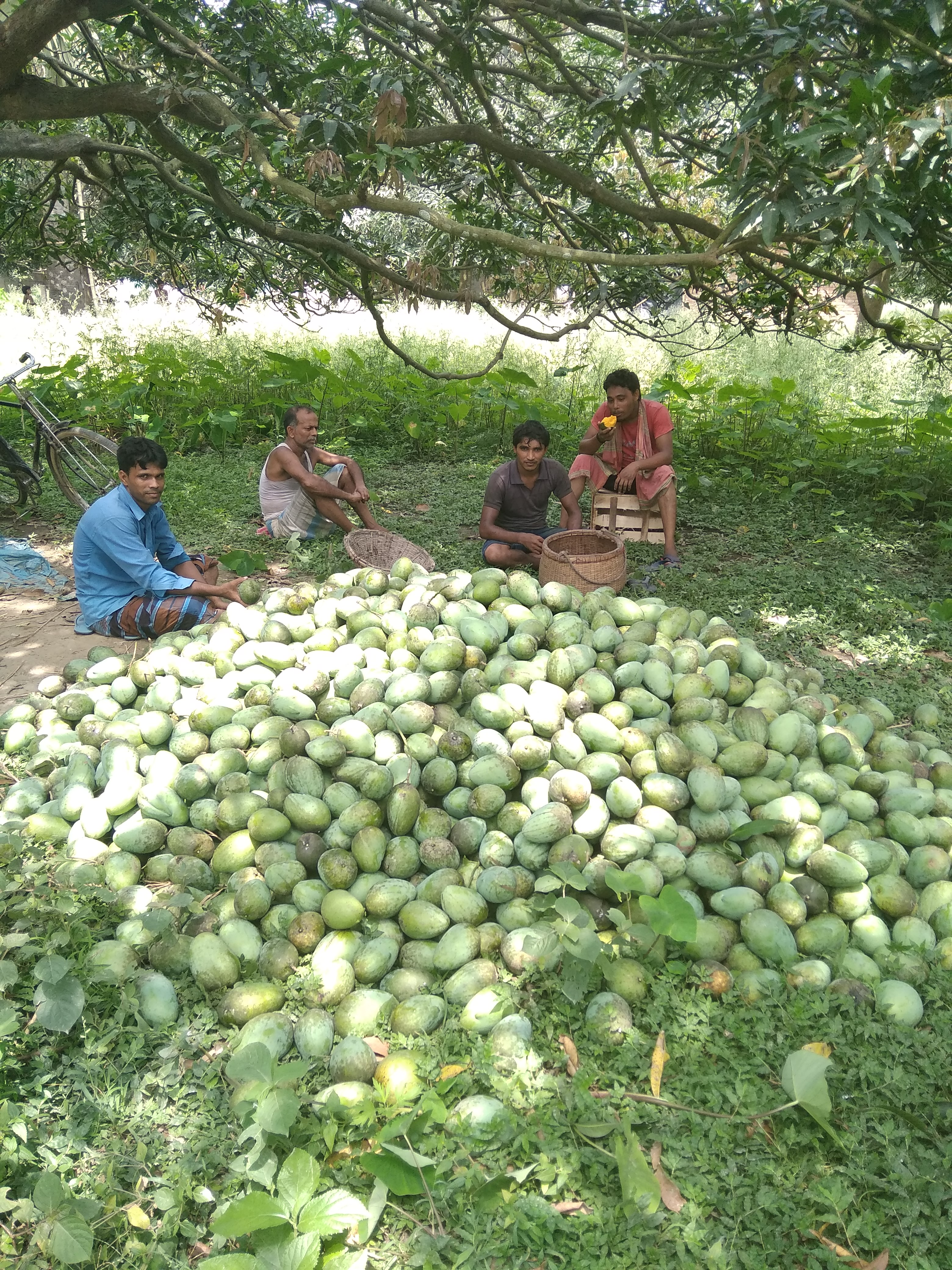
Sattari Mango Garden

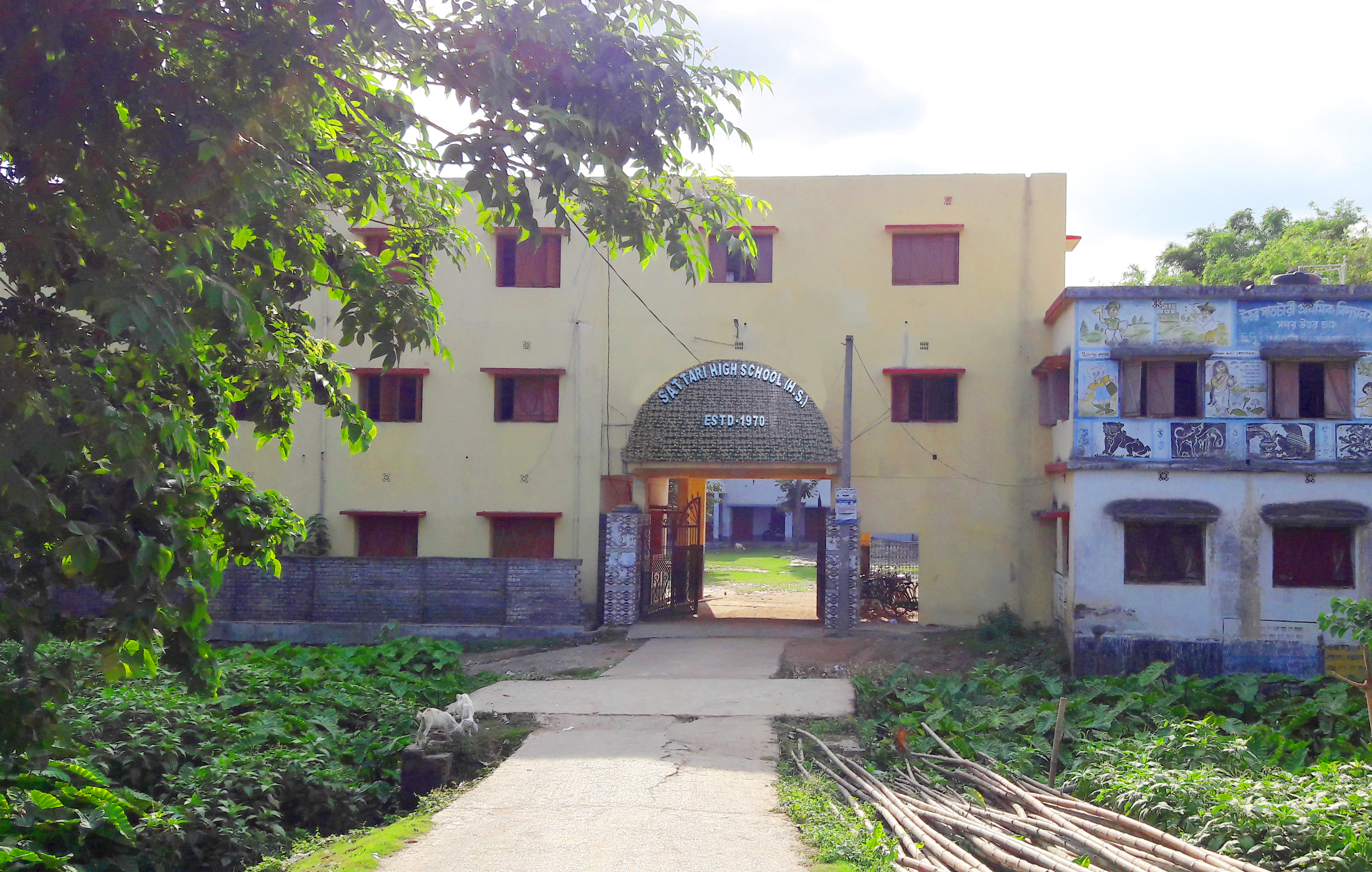
Sattari High School Building

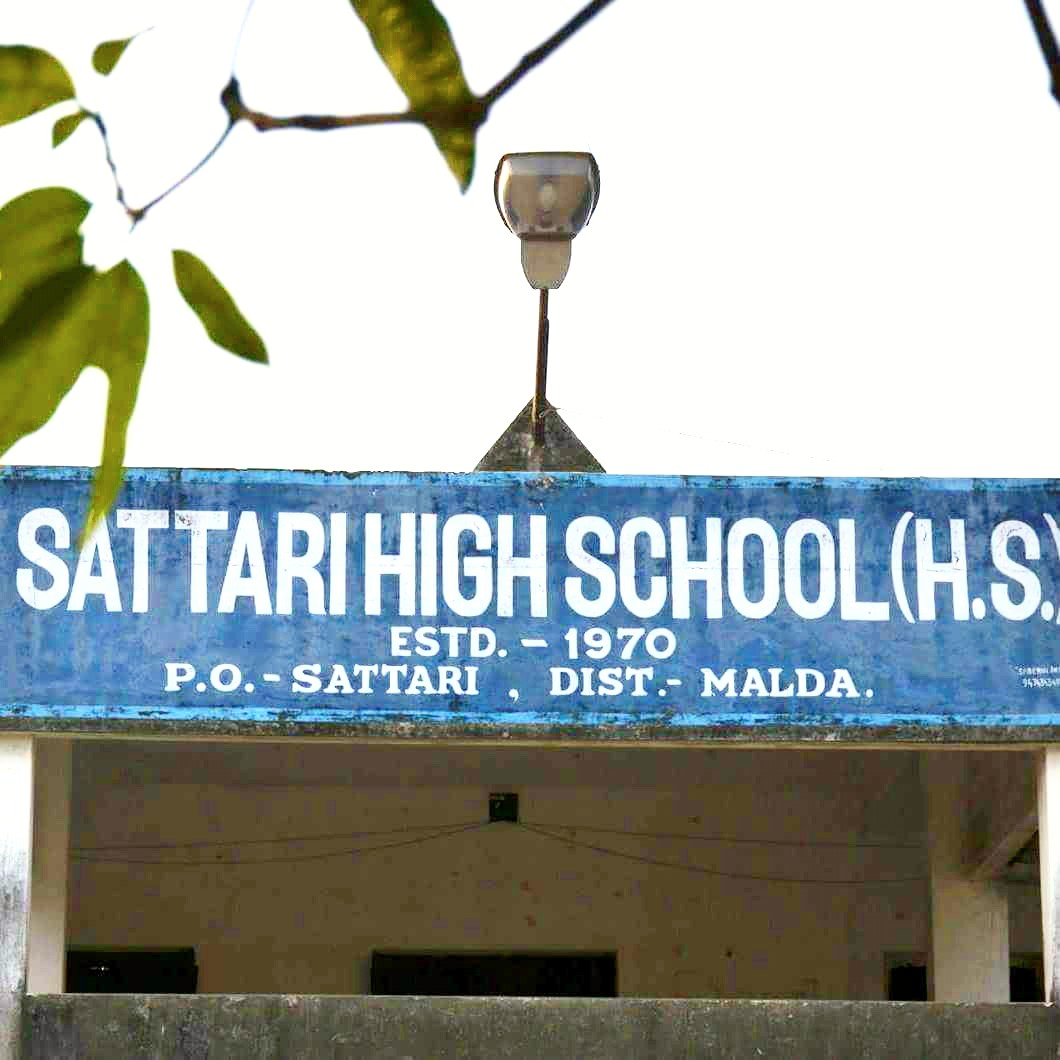
Sattari High School

== See also ==
- English Bazar (community development block)
