= English Bazar Assembly constituency =

English Bazar
- Constituency No. 51 for the West Bengal Legislative Assembly
- Interactive Map Outlining English Bazar Assembly Constituency

Constituency details
- Country: India
- Region: East India
- State: West Bengal
- Division: Malda
- District: Malda
- Lok Sabha constituency: Maldaha Dakshin
- Established: 1957
- Total electors: 249,137
- Reservation: None

Member of Legislative Assembly
- 18th West Bengal Legislative Assembly
- Incumbent Amlan Bhaduri
- Party: BJP
- Alliance: NDA
- Elected year: 2026
- Preceded by: Sreerupa Mitra Chaudhury (BJP)

English Bazar Assembly constituency is an assembly constituency in Maldah district in the Indian state of West Bengal.

== Overview ==
As per orders of the Delimitation Commission, No. 51 English Bazar Assembly constituency covers English Bazar Municipality and Amriti, Binodpur Gram Panchayat, Jadupur I, Jadupur II, Kajigram, Kotwali and Mahadipur gram panchayats of English Bazar community development block,

English Bazar Assembly constituency is part of No. 8 Maldaha Dakshin (Lok Sabha constituency). It was earlier part of Malda (Lok Sabha constituency).

== Members of the Legislative Assembly ==
Year	Name	Party
1957	Santi Gopal Sen	Indian National Congress
1962	Santi Gopal Sen	Indian National Congress
1967	Santi Gopal Sen	Indian National Congress
1969	Bimal Kanti Das	Communist Party of India
1971	Bimal Kanti Das	Communist Party of India
1972	Bimal Kanti Das	Communist Party of India
1977	Sailen Sarkar	Communist Party of India
1982	Sailen Sarkar	Communist Party of India
1987	Sailen Sarkar	Communist Party of India
1991	Prabhat Acharya	Communist Party of India
1996	Goutam Chakraborty	Indian National Congress
2001	Samar Roy	Communist Party of India (Marxist)
2006	Krishnendu Narayan Choudhury	Indian National Congress
2011	Krishnendu Narayan Choudhury	Indian National Congress
2013^	Krishnendu Narayan Choudhury	Trinamool Congress
2016	Nihar Ranjan Ghosh	Independent
2021	Sreerupa Mitra Chaudhury	Bharatiya Janata Party
2026	Amlan Bhaduri	Bharatiya Janata Party

- ^ by-election

== Election results ==
Vote share of winning candidates
2026	65.70%
2021	49.96%
2016	52.80%
2013 (by-election)	39.33%
2011	51.79%
2006	46.03%
2001	38.49%
1996	41.23%
1991	34.74%
1987	52.99%
1982	46.72%
1977	31.56%
1972	54.94%
1971	31.59%
1969	54.76%
1967	32.56%
1962	40.60%
1957	49.14%

=== 2026 ===
2026 West Bengal Legislative Assembly election: English Bazar
Party	Candidate	Votes	%	±%
BJP	Amlan Bhaduri	154,096	65.70	▲15.74
AITC	Ashish Kundu	60,312	25.71	▼14.93
CPI(M)	Ambar Mitra	7,122	3.04	▼2.04
INC	Masud Alam	6,929	2.95	New entry
NOTA	None of the above	1,727	0.74	▼0.74
Majority		93,784	39.99	▲30.67
Turnout		234,560	93.95	▲15.61
BJP hold		Swing		

=== 2021 ===
2021 West Bengal Legislative Assembly election: English Bazar
Party	Candidate	Votes	%	±%
BJP	Sreerupa Mitra Choudhury	107,755	49.96	
AITC	Krishnendu Narayan Choudhury	87,656	40.64	
CPI(M)	Koushik Mishra	10,953	5.08	
NOTA	None of the above	3,196	1.48	
Majority		20,099	9.32	
Turnout		215,675	78.34	
BJP gain from Independent		Swing		

=== 2016 ===
In the 2016 election, Nihar Ranjan Ghosh of Left Front-Congress Supported Independent defeated his nearest rival Krishnendu Narayan Chowdhury of Trinamool Congress.

2016 West Bengal Legislative Assembly election: English Bazar
Party	Candidate	Votes	%	±%
Independent	Nihar Ranjan Ghosh	107,183	52.80	
AITC	Krishnendu Narayan Choudhury	67,456	33.30	
BJP	Suman Banerjee	23,171	11.4	
NOTA	None of the above	4,336	2.09	
Independent	Nihar Ghosh	2,293	1.11	
Majority		39,727	19.17	
Turnout		2,07,542	84.10	
Independent gain from AITC		Swing		

.# Swing based on LF+Congress vote percentages taken together in 2016.

=== 2013 bypoll ===
The 2013 by-election was necessitated by the switch-over of sitting Congress MLA Krishnendu Narayan Choudhury to Trinamool Congress.

By-election, 2013: English Bazar
Party	Candidate	Votes	%	±%
AITC	Krishnendu Narayan Choudhury	70,791	39.33	+39.33
CPI(M)	Koushik Mishra (Saheb)	50,339	27.96	−11.19
INC	Narendra Nath Tiwari	45,271	25.15	−26.64
BJP	Sanjit Misra	9,442	5.24	−0.62
IND	Satish Rajbanshi	2,851	1.58	
Majority		20,452	11.36	
Turnout		179,990	81.79	
AITC gain from INC		Swing		

=== 2011 ===
In the 2011 election, Krishnendu Narayan Chowdhury of Congress defeated his nearest rival Samarananda Roy of CPI(M).

2011 West Bengal Legislative Assembly election: English Bazar
Party	Candidate	Votes	%	±%
INC	Krishnendu Narayan Choudhury	89,421	51.79	+0.48#
CPI(M)	Samarendra Roy	67,592	39.15	−6.49
BJP	Gobinda Chandra Mandal	10,116	5.86	
IND	Satish Rajbanshi	2,527	1.46	
IND	Uma Das	1,535	0.89	
Majority		21,829	12.64	
Turnout		1,72,830	82.88	
INC hold		Swing	+6.97#	

.# Swing based on Congress+Trinamool Congress vote percentages taken together in 2006.

=== 2006 ===
2006 West Bengal Legislative Assembly election: Englishbazar
Party	Candidate	Votes	%	±%
INC	Krishnendu Narayan Choudhury	67,246	46.03	
CPI(M)	Samar Roy	66,670	45.64	
AITC	Chaitali Ghosh (Sarkar)	5,886	4.03	
Independent	Ananta Chakraborty	3,805	2.60	
BSP	Chandra Kanta Roy	2,120	1.45	
Majority		576	0.39	
Turnout		146,088		
Swing to INC from CPI(M)		Swing		

=== 2001 ===
2001 West Bengal Legislative Assembly election: Englishbazar
Party	Candidate	Votes	%	±%
CPI(M)	Samar Roy	50,507	38.49	
INC	Goutam Chakraborty	38,557	29.39	
AITC	Krishnendu Narayan Choudhury	32,833	25.02	
BJP	Govinda Mondal	9,313	7.10	
Majority		11,950	9.10	
Turnout		131,302	77.34	
Swing to CPI(M) from INC		Swing		

=== 1996 ===
1996 West Bengal Legislative Assembly election: Englishbazar
Party	Candidate	Votes	%	±%
INC	Goutam Chakravartty	53,653	41.23	
CPI(M)	Ashok Bhattacharjya	42,992	33.04	
BJP	Tapan Sikdar	31,965	24.57	
Independent	Manab Banerjee	853	0.66	
Independent	Dharanidhar Mondal	351	0.27	
Independent	Bimal Kumar Kundu	240	0.18	
Independent	Md. Hasen Ali	64	0.05	
Majority		10,661	8.19	
Turnout		130,118	82.87	
Swing to INC from CPI(M)		Swing		

=== 1991 ===
1991 West Bengal Legislative Assembly election: Englishbazar
Party	Candidate	Votes	%	±%
CPI(M)	Prabhat Acharya	37,462	34.74	
INC	Pradip Kar	35,069	32.53	
BJP	Tapan Sikdar	35,050	32.51	
Independent	Raghupati Bhattacharyya	239	0.22	
Majority		2,393	2.21	
Turnout		110,066	79.75	
Swing to CPI(M) from INC		Swing		

=== 1987 ===
1987 West Bengal Legislative Assembly election: Englishbazar
Party	Candidate	Votes	%	±%
CPI(M)	Sailen Sarkar	45,316	52.99	
INC	Asok Kundu	34,040	39.80	
BJP	Jatindra Nath Ghosh	3,198	3.74	
Independent	Sukhendu Sekhar Roy	2,089	2.44	
Independent	Asadul Sardar	478	0.56	
Independent	Nirmal Das	267	0.31	
Independent	Sajjad	136	0.16	
Majority		11,276	13.19	
Turnout		86,849	76.50	
Swing to CPI(M) from INC		Swing		

=== 1982 ===
1982 West Bengal Legislative Assembly election: Englishbazar
Party	Candidate	Votes	%	±%
CPI(M)	Sailen Sarkar	36,023	46.72	
INC	Swapan Mitra	34,326	44.52	
BJP	Hari Prasanna Misra	6,754	8.76	
Majority		1,697	2.20	
Turnout		78,396	79.94	
Swing to CPI(M) from INC		Swing		

=== 1977 ===
1977 West Bengal Legislative Assembly election: Englishbazar
Party	Candidate	Votes	%	±%
CPI(M)	Sailen Sarkar	13,851	31.56	
JP	Hari Prasanna Misra	13,601	30.99	
CPI	Bimal Das	7,993	18.21	
INC	Asit Basu	4,988	11.37	
Independent	Mannan Sheikh	2,853	6.50	
Independent	Shaikh Ayub	231	0.53	
Independent	Arun Mondal	149	0.34	
Independent	Narendra Nath Mondal	125	0.28	
Independent	Madan Mohan Choudhury	97	0.22	
Majority		250	0.57	
Turnout		44,706	52.61	
Swing to CPI(M) from JP		Swing		

=== 1972 ===
1972 West Bengal Legislative Assembly election: Englishbazar
Party	Candidate	Votes	%	±%
CPI	Bimal Das	25,116	54.94	
CPI(M)	Sailendra Sarkar	14,281	31.24	
ABJS	Hari Prasanna Misra	6,319	13.82	
Majority		10,835	23.70	
Turnout		47,320	62.96	
Swing to CPI from CPI(M)		Swing		

=== 1971 ===
1971 West Bengal Legislative Assembly election: Englishbazar
Party	Candidate	Votes	%	±%
CPI	Bimal Kanti Das	14,290	31.59	
ABJS	Hari Prasanna Misra	12,063	26.67	
CPI(M)	Sailendu Jha Manik	10,287	22.74	
INC	Nikhil Bihari Gupta	7,782	17.21	
Independent	Kamiruddin Ahmed	807	1.78	
Majority		2,227	4.92	
Turnout		48,644	65.86	
Swing to CPI from ABJS		Swing		

=== 1969 ===
1969 West Bengal Legislative Assembly election: Englishbazar
Party	Candidate	Votes	%	±%
CPI	Bimal Kanti Das	24,306	54.76	
INC	Santi Gopal Sen	14,184	31.96	
ABJS	Hariprasanna Misra	5,213	11.75	
NDF	Md. Hossain	681	1.53	
Majority		10,122	22.80	
Turnout		45,586	68.02	
Swing to CPI from INC		Swing		

=== 1967 ===
1967 West Bengal Legislative Assembly election: Englishbazar
Party	Candidate	Votes	%	±%
INC	S. G. Sen	12,593	32.56	
CPI	B. K. Das	9,647	24.94	
CPI(M)	S. Jha	7,034	18.19	
ABJS	H. Misra	5,789	14.97	
Independent	M. H. F. Rahaman	2,102	5.43	
SWA	A. D. Dutta	1,515	3.92	
Majority		2,946	7.62	
Turnout		41,853	65.56	
Swing to INC from CPI		Swing		

=== 1962 ===
1962 West Bengal Legislative Assembly election: Englishbazar
Party	Candidate	Votes	%	±%
INC	Santigopal Sen	12,055	40.60	
Independent	Profulladhan Mukerjee	10,006	33.70	
Independent	Syed Mustaq Ali	5,834	19.65	
Independent	Krishna Kripal Satial	1,794	6.04	
Majority		2,049	6.90	
Turnout		32,324	54.20	
Swing to INC from Independent		Swing		

=== 1957 ===
1957 West Bengal Legislative Assembly election: Englishbazar
Party	Candidate	Votes	%	±%
INC	Santi Gopal Sen	13,545	49.14	
CPI	Narendra Nath Chakraborty	9,628	34.93	
ABJS	Subh Naraan Giri	4,392	15.93	
Majority		3,917	14.21	
Turnout		27,565	53.47	
Swing to INC from CPI		Swing		
