= Sahazalalpur =

- Village
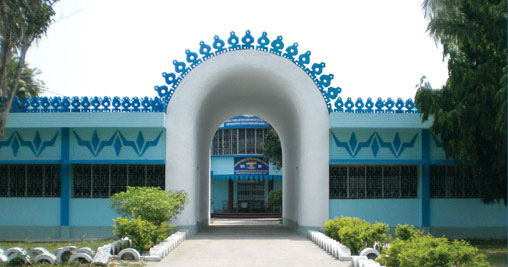
- Kotwali Bhavan
- Nickname: Kotwali
- Location in West Bengal, India Sahazalalpur (India) Sahazalalpur (Asia)
- Coordinates: 25.0479°N 88.1011°E
- Country: India
- State: West Bengal
- District: Malda

Area
  - Total: 8.84 km^{2} (3.41 sq mi)
- Elevation: 30 m (98 ft)

Population (2011)
  - Total: 3,195
  - Density: 361/km^{2} (936/sq mi)

Languages
  - Official: Bengali
  - Additional official: English
- Time zone: UTC+5:30 (IST)
- Postal code: 732103
- Vehicle registration: WB
- Lok Sabha constituency: Maldaha Dakhsin
- Vidhan Sabha constituency: English Bazar
- Website: malda.nic.in

Sahazalalpur is a village in English Bazar Block of Malda district in the state of West Bengal, India. Kotwali Bhavan (the house of former, Railways Minister A.B.A. Ghani Khan Choudhury) is located there.

== Geography ==
Sahazalalpur village is located 25.0479°N 88.1011°E in the English Bazar Block of Malda district. The nearest railway station is Malda Town which is 6 km away. The district headquarters is located 7 km away in English Bazar.

== Notable people ==
- A.B.A. Ghani Khan Choudhury Minister of Railways
- Abu Hasem Khan Choudhury, his brother, Minister of Health and Family Welfare
- Mausam Noor, their niece, Member of Parliament
