= Binodpur Gram Panchayat =

Government office in West Bengal

- বিনোদপুর গ্রাম পঞ্চায়েত
- Abbreviation: BGP
- Nickname: Sattari Gram Panchayat
- Formation: 1975, (43 years ago)
- Type: Government Office
- Legal status: Active
- Headquarters: Sattari
- Coordinates: 24°59′29″N 88°02′14″E
- Members: AITC: 7 seats BJP: 6 seats (2018)
- Official language: Bengali language, English
- Pradhan: Rita Chowdhury
- Deputy Pradhan: Amin Mia
- Affiliations: Panchayati raj
- Website: malda.gov.in
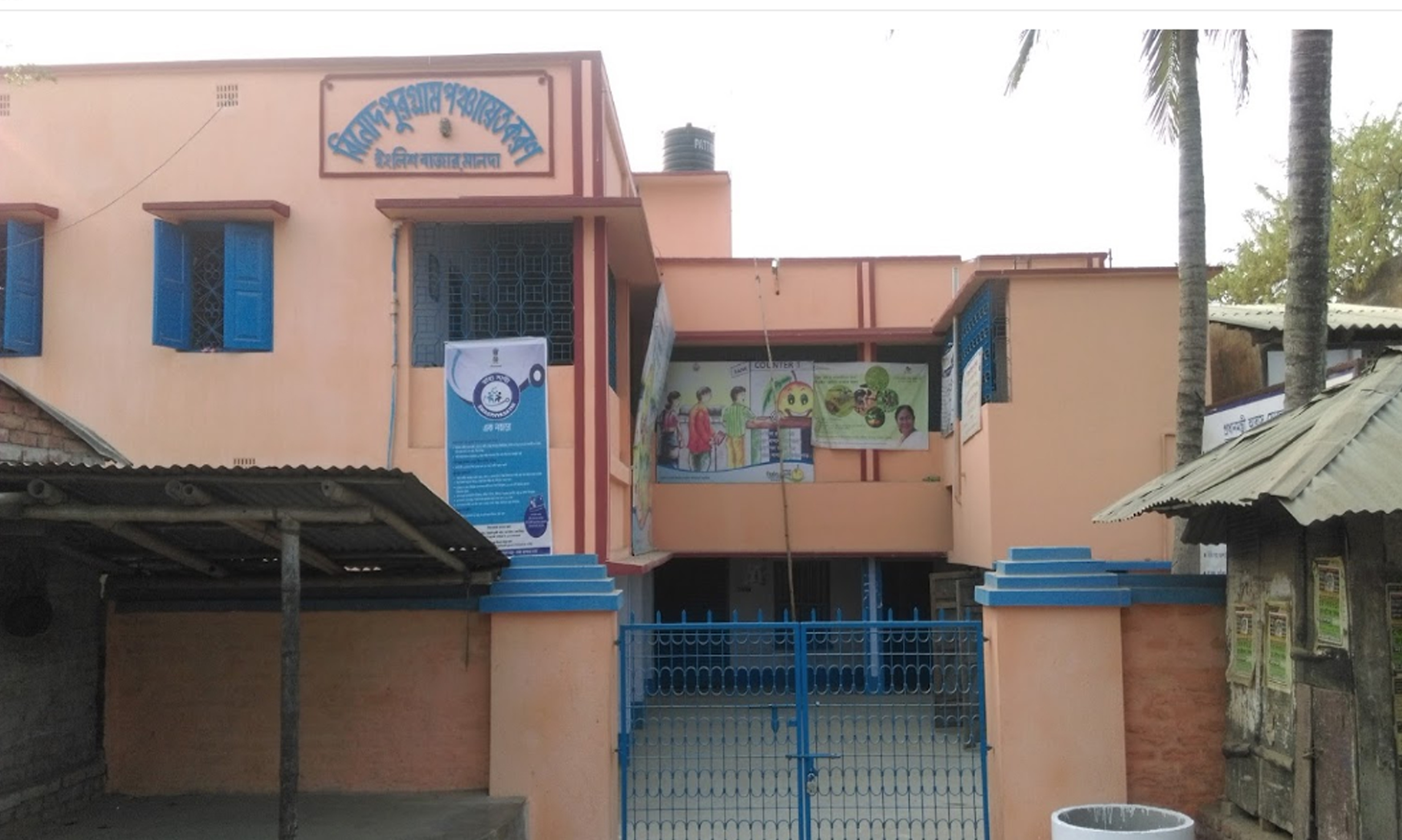

The Gram Panchayat of Sattari or Sattari Gram Panchayat also known as Binodpur Gram Panchayat (abbreviated as BGP), is a government office and local self-government body that governs the village of Sattari and 8 nearby villages with 13 G.P constituencies or three Panchayat Samity constituencies in English Bazar Block of District Malda in the state of West Bengal, India. It has control of The English Bazar police station serves this panchayat, with its headquarters at Sattari village.

== Geography ==
Binodpur Gram Panchayat is located at 24.9913°N 88.0372°E Sattari village of English Bazar Block in Malda district.

== History ==
The Binodpur Gram Panchayat was panchayati raj power held by Government of West Bengal since 1977 under Panchayati raj (India). This panchayat is administrated by English Bazar Block.

On 27 July 2012 the office was vandalized by angry villagers who were demanding road repairs. While pradhan of the district allowed the meeting to begin, he himself wasn't present and therefore angered the community.

== Pradhans ==
SL No.	Pradhan Name	Term
1	Badri Narayan Chowdhury	1977-1992
2	Sunil Chandra Chowdhury	1992-1997
3	Golenur Bibi	1997-2003
4	Sabita Sarker	2003-2005
5	Jodshna Chowdhury	2005-2007
6	Mithu Chowdhury	2007-2008
7	Dhirobala Chowdhury	2008-2013
8	Fatema Bibi	2013-2014
9	Minu Mamataj Bibi	2014-2015
10	Pampa Chowdhury (I.C)	2015-2018
11	Rita Chowdhury	Incumbent

== Electoral divisions ==
Gram Panchayat seats at Binodpur Gram Panchayat

Polling Station no.	Area	Polling Station	Village
1	Lalapur	Lalapur Junior Basic School	Lalapur
2	Chhoto Barampur, Bara Barampur	Bara Baramapur I.C.D.S Centar	Barampur
3	Kabala Gonsaipur, Bara Gonsaipur, Chhoto Gonsaipur	Gonsaipur Managed Primary School	Gonsaipur
4	Mobarakpur	Mobarakapur Managed Primary School	Mobarakpur
5	Mathurapur	Mathurapur Primary School	Mathurapur
6	Binodpur	Binodpur Junior Basic School	Binodpur
7	Basudebpur, Krishnanagar	Basudebpur Primary School	Basudebpur
8	Niamatpur	Niamatapur C.S. Primary School	Niamatpur
9	Natunpara	Sattari Sarbojanin Primary School	Sattari
10	Jarlahipara, Bazarpara	Sattari Sarbojanin Primary School	Sattari
11	Masjidpara	Sattari High School	Sattari
12	Basantapur, Nimtala	Sattari High School	Sattari
13	Nagarpara, Tiarpara, Helupara	Sattari Junior Basic School	Sattari
14	Puratan Choudhurypara, Natun Choudhurypara, Khatiyakana	Sattari Junior Basic School	Sattari
15	Titipara, Dakshin Chandipur	Sattari High School	Sattari
16	Kagmari Hatpara	Sattari High School	Sattari

Panchayat Samiti seats at Binodpur Gram Panchayat

Panchayat Samiti	Seat Name	Polling Station No.	Type
English Bazar	P.S-12	(1,2,3,4,5)	Open
English Bazar	P.S-13	(6,7,8,9)	Open
English Bazar	P.S-14	(10,11,12,13)	Open

== Members of Gram Panchayat ==
Member of Binodpur Gram Panchayat 2018

Member name	Seat name	Portrait	Political party	Ref	Year (length)
Sima Mondal	(Part-I/1)		Bharatiya Janata Party		Incumbent
Sachin Chandra Mandal	(Part-II/2)		Bharatiya Janata Party		Incumbent
Babita Rani Sarkar	(Part-III/3)		Bharatiya Janata Party		Incumbent
Pabitra Mandal	(Part-IV/4)		Bharatiya Janata Party		Incumbent
Sefali Ghosh (Mandal)	(Part-V/5)		Bharatiya Janata Party		Incumbent
Sagari Mandal	(Part-VI/6)		Bharatiya Janata Party		Incumbent
Sk. Jamil	(Part-VII/7)		All India Trinamool Congress		Incumbent
Amin Mia	(Part-VIII/8)		All India Trinamool Congress		Incumbent
Rahena Bibi	(Part-IX/9)		All India Trinamool Congress		Incumbent
Md.Sarifuddin Mia	(Part-X/10)		All India Trinamool Congress		Incumbent
Md Raju Mia	(Part-XI/11)		All India Trinamool Congress		Incumbent
Rita Chowdhury	(Part-XII/12)		All India Trinamool Congress		Incumbent
Kanika Chowdhury	(Part-XIII/13)		All India Trinamool Congress		Incumbent

Member of Binodpur Gram Panchayat 2013-2018

Member name	Seat name	Political party	Ref	Year (length)
Shima Mandal	(Part-I/1)	All India Trinamool Congress		2013–2018
Shibani Mandal	(Part-II/2)	All India Trinamool Congress		2013–2018
Subodh Sarkar	(Part-III/3)	Communist Party of India		2013–2018
Tandra Mandal	(Part-IV/4)	All India Trinamool Congress		2013–2018
Palash Chandra Mandal	(Part-V/5)	All India Trinamool Congress		2013–2018
Bhadu Ghos	(Part-VI/6)	Communist Party of India		2013–2018
Minu Momtaj Bibi	(Part-VII/7)	Communist Party of India		2013–2018
Mokbel Mia	(Part-VIII/8)	Communist Party of India		2004–2018
Nargis	(Part-IX/9)	Communist Party of India		2009–2018
Fatema Bibi	(Part-X/10)	Communist Party of India		2013–2018
Sabbir Mia	(Part-XI/11)	Communist Party of India		2013–2018
Pompa Choudhury	(Part-XII/12)	All India Trinamool Congress		2013–2018
Jharna Swarnakar	(Part-XIII/13)	All India Trinamool Congress		2013–2018

== Members of Panchayat Samity ==
Members of Panchayat Samity at Binodpur Gram Panchayat 2018

PS member name	Seat name	Political party	Ref	Year (length)
Satyarama Mandal	(PS-12)	Bharatiya Janata Party		Incumbent
Najia Begam	(PS-13)	All India Trinamool Congress		Incumbent
Jayanta Mandal	(PS-14)	All India Trinamool Congress		Incumbent

Members of Panchayat Samity at Binodpur Gram Panchayat 2013

PS member name	Seat name	Political party	Ref	Year (length)
Provakar Mandal	(PS-12)	All India Trinamool Congress		2013–2018
Babli Khatun	(PS-13)	Communist Party of India		2013–2018
Jaba Chowdhury	(PS-14)	All India Trinamool Congress		2013–2018

== Villages ==
It covers 9 villages, with their names and parts as follows.

Village name	Polling Station No.	Type
Lalapur	1	Rural
Barampur	2	Rural
Gonsaipur	3	Rural
Mobarakpur	4	Rural
Mathurapur	5	Rural
Binodpur	6	Rural
Basudebpur	7	Rural
Niamatpur	8	Rural
Sattari	9,10,11,12,13,14,15,16	Rural

== See also ==
- Sattari
- Milki
