= Asif Mehbub =

Indian politician

Asif Mehbub (born 1982) is an Indian politician from West Bengal. He is a former member of the West Bengal Legislative Assembly from Chanchal Assembly constituency in Malda district. He won the 2016 West Bengal Legislative Assembly election representing the Indian National Congress.

== Early life and education ==
Mehbub is from Chanchal, Malda district, West Bengal. He is the son of late Mahabubul Haque. He is into cultivation. He completed his Master of Fine Arts at Kala Bhavan, Visva-Bharati University, in 2007.

== Career ==
Mehbub was elected from Chanchal Assembly constituency representing the Indian National Congress in the 2016 West Bengal Legislative Assembly election. He polled 92,590 votes and defeated his nearest rival, Soumitra Ray of the All India Trinamool Congress, by a margin of 52,368 votes. He was first elected as an MLA in the 2011 West Bengal Legislative Assembly election where he polled 68,586 votes and defeated his closest opponent, Anjuman Ara Begam of the Communist Party of India (Marxist), by a margin of 14,187 votes. He lost the 2021 West Bengal Legislative Assembly election won by Nihar Ranjan Ghosh of the Trinamool Congress and could finish only third, behind second placed Dipankar Ram (Bankat) of the Bharatiya Janata Party.
