= Gram panchayat =

Local self-government organisation in India

Gram Panchayat
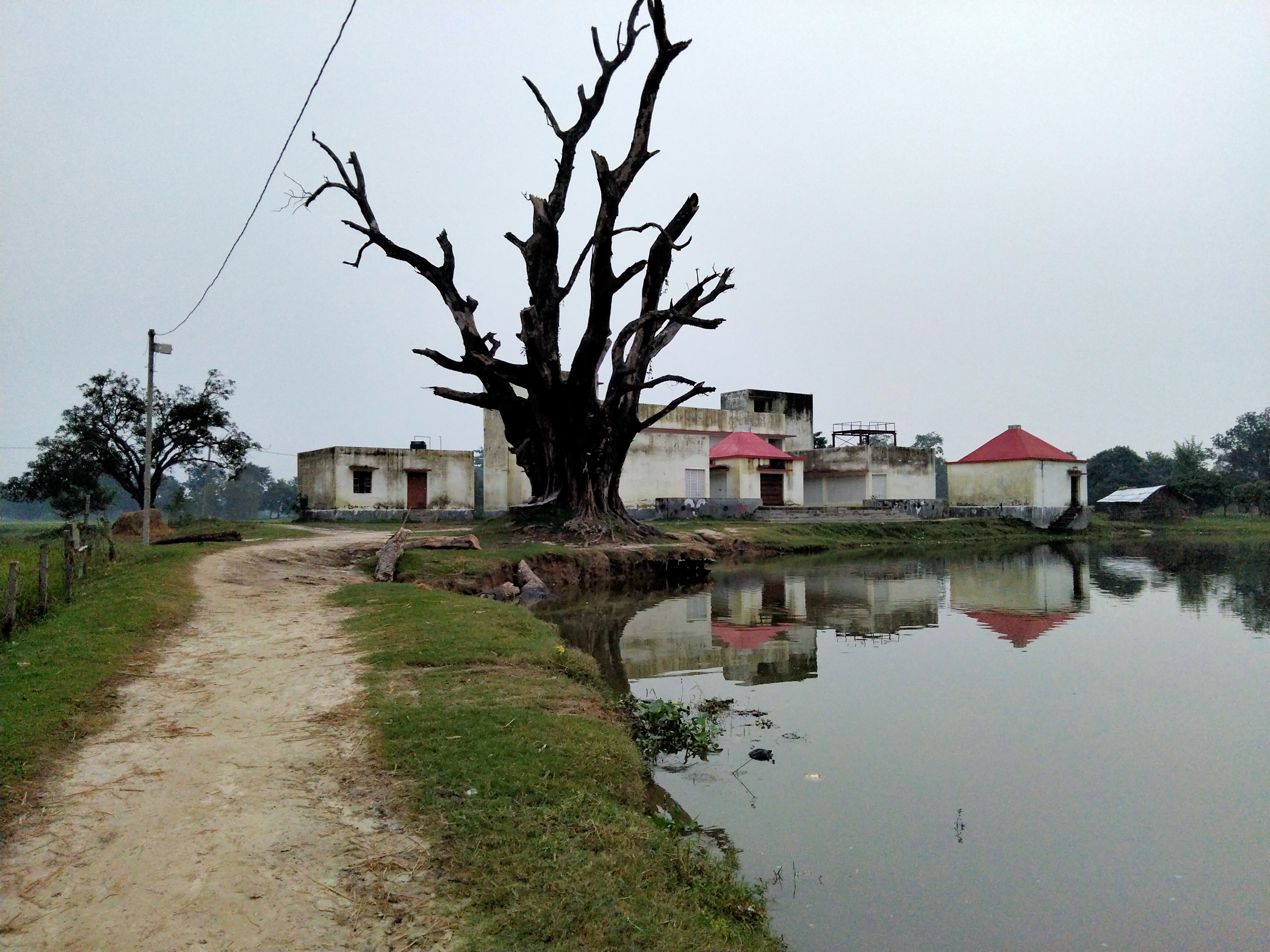
- View of a Grampanchayat Raj Bhavan, at the village of Basuki Bihari.
- Polity type: Local government
- Part of: Panchayati Raj System (Zilla Parishad, Panchayat Samiti)
- Formation: 2 October 1959

Legislative branch
- Name: Gram-sabha

Executive branch
- Supreme leader
- Title: President (Pradhan/Sarpanch)
- Cabinet
- Appointer: Block Development Officer

Judicial branch
- Courts: Nyaya Panchayat

Gram Panchayat (transl. 'village council') is a basic governing institution in Indian villages. It is a political institution, acting as the cabinet of a village or group of villages. The Gram Sabha works as the general body of the Gram Panchayat. The members of the Gram Panchayat are elected directly by the people. The gram panchayat is headed by an elected President and Vice President, assisted by a Secretary who serves as the administrative head of the panchayat. The president of a gram panchayat is known as a "Pradhan" or "Sarpanch" in Northern India. There are about 250,000 gram panchayats in India.

== History ==
Established in various states of India, the Panchayat Raj system has three tiers: Zila Parishad, at the district level; Panchayat Samiti, at the block level; and Gram Panchayat, at the village level.

- Rajasthan was the first state to establish Gram Panchayat, Bagdari Village, Nagaur District being the first village where Gram Panchayat was established, on 2 October 1959.

In 1992, the institution of Gram Panchayat was modified in order to deepen democracy. The 73rd Amendment to the Constitution re-introduced panchayats as the institutions of local self-governance, with a basic structure for operations at three administrative levels; villages, groups of villages and districts.

== Structure ==
Gram Panchayats are at the lowest level of Panchayat Raj institutions (PRIs), whose legal authority is the 73rd Constitutional Amendment of 1992, which is concerned with rural local governments.

- Panchayat at District (or apex) Level
- Panchayat at Intermediate Level
- Panchayat at Base Level

The Gram Panchayat is divided into wards and each ward is represented by a Ward Member or Commissioner, also referred to as a Panch or Panchayat Member, who is directly elected by the villagers. The Panchayat is chaired by the president of the gram panchayat, commonly known as the Pradhan or Sarpanch in many North Indian states. The term of the elected representatives is five years. The Secretary of the Panchayat is a non-elected representative, appointed by the state government, to oversee Panchayat activities.

Structure

Republic of India
States	Union Territories
Divisions
Districts
Blocks (Panchayat Samiti/Block Panchayat)	Municipal Corporations (Nagar Nigam/Maha Nagar Palika)	Municipalities (Nagar Palika)	Town Councils (Nagar Panchayat)
Villages (Gram Panchayat/Gram Sabha)	Wards

=== Meetings ===
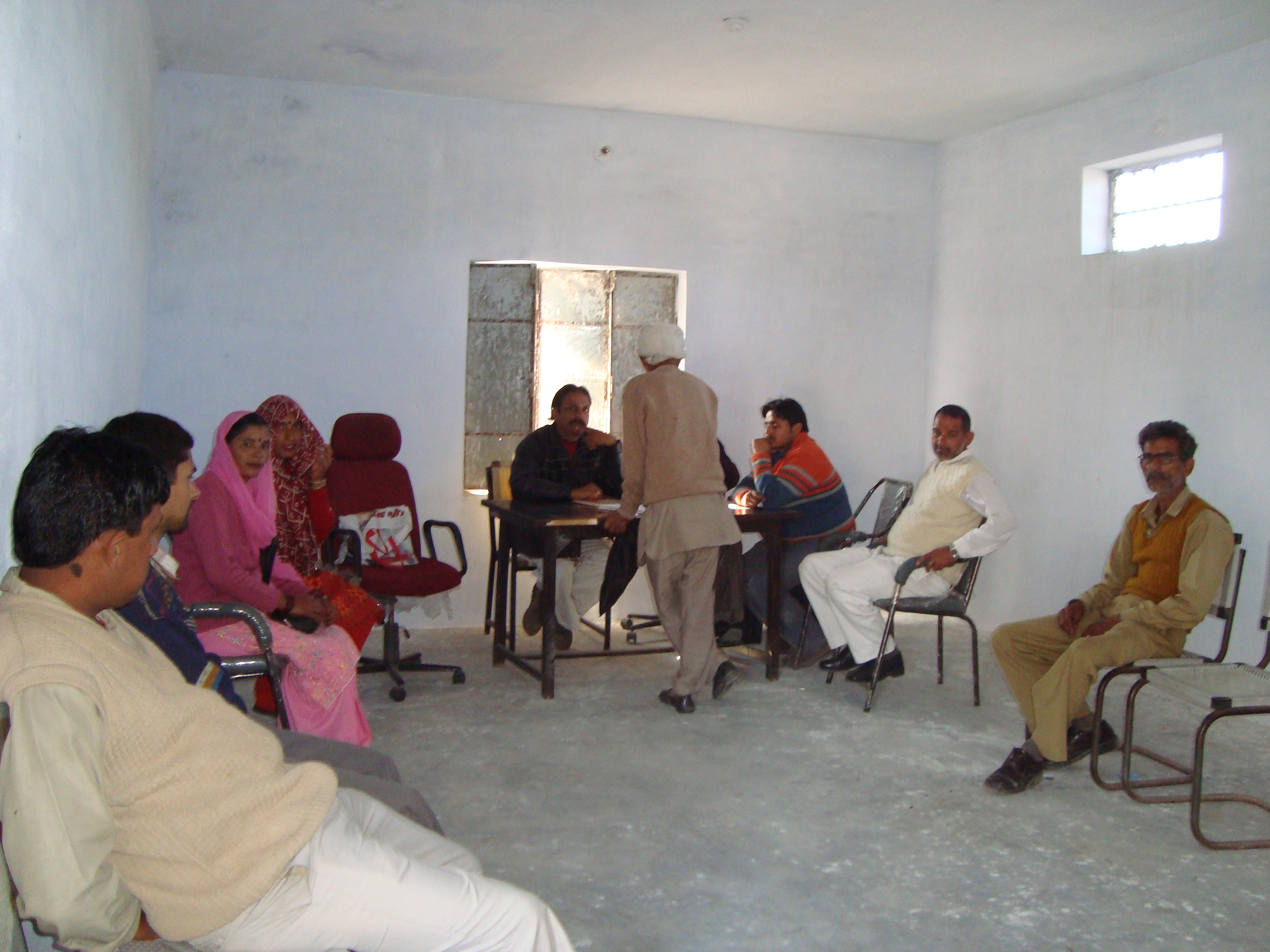
Gram Sabha

According to Section. 6 (3) of the Andhra Pradesh Panchayat Raj Act of 1994, a state's gram sabha has to conduct a meeting at least once within every two months.

== Election ==
Gram Panchayat elections in India occur every five years. The village is divided into wards, and people in each ward vote for their representative. These elected members, along with the president (sarpanch or pradhan) and vice president, form the Gram Panchayat. The president (sarpanch) and vice president (upa-sarpanch) in a gram Panchayat are elected from among the elected ward members. the term of office for elected members in a Gram Panchayat, including the Sarpanch and Upa-Sarpanch, is typically five years. All people over the age of 18 who are residents of the territory of that village's Gram panchayat can vote.

The mode of election of the Gram Panchayat chairperson or president (Sarpanch/Pradhan) varies by state and may be direct or indirect under the respective State Panchayati Raj Acts; for instance, Maharashtra follows a system of direct election of the Sarpanch.

For women's empowerment and to encourage participation of women in the democratic process, the government of India has set some restrictions on Gram panchayat elections, reserving one-third of the seats for women, as well as reserving seats for scheduled castes and tribes.

== Functions ==
- Administrative functions
  - Public work and welfare functions, such as maintenance, repair and construction of roads, drains, bridges, and wells.
  - Install and maintain street lamps.
  - Provide primary education.
- Social and Economic functions (not obligatory)
  - Construct libraries, marriage halls, etc.
  - Establish and run fair-price shops and cooperative credit societies.
  - Establish gardens, ponds, and orchards.
- Judicial functions (Nyaya Panchayat; the state judicial service decides jurisdiction.)
  - Ensure quick and inexpensive justice.
  - Can impose fines up to ₹100.
  - Not represented by lawyers.

== See also ==
- Binodpur Gram Panchayat
- Caste panchayat
- Khap
- Lambardar
- Zaildar
