= English Bazar Municipality =

Municipal Corporation in West Bengal, India

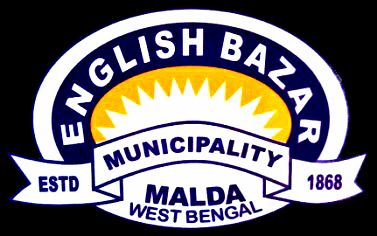
- Emblem

Type
- Type: Municipality

History
- Founded: 1868; 158 years ago

Leadership
- Chairman: Krishnendu Narayan Choudhury, AITC
- Vice Chairman: Sumala Agarwal, AITC

Structure
- Seats: 29
- Political groups: Government (25): AITC (25); Opposition (2): BJP (3); Other (1): IND (1)

Elections
- Last election: 2022
- Next election: 2027

Meeting place
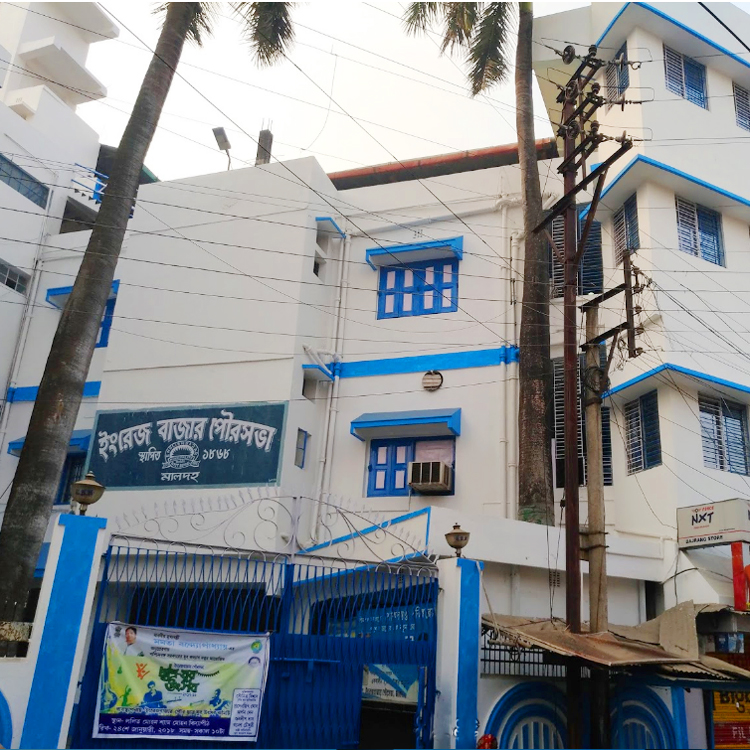
- Municipality Building

Website
- www.englishbazarmunicipality.org

English Bazar Municipality is responsible for the civic administration of the town of Malda in Malda district, West Bengal, India. Established in 1868, it is one of the oldest Municipalities in India.

== Geography ==
English Bazar Municipality is located at 25.0007°N 88.1466°E in the city of Malda.

== Councillors of Municipality ==
=== Councillors of E.B.M (2015–2020) ===
Name	Ward No.	Political party	Ref	Year (length)
Rajib Champari	1	Bharatiya Janata Party		2015–2020
Sumala Agarwala	2	All India Trinamool Congress		2015–2020
Manisha Saha Mandal	3	All India Trinamool Congress		2022-present
Ashok Saha	4	All India Trinamool Congress		2015–2020
Sumita Banerjee	5	All India Trinamool Congress		2015–2020
Shipra Roy	6	Revolutionary Socialist Party		2015–2020
Subrata Sardar (Barun)	7	All India Trinamool Congress		2015–2020
Kakali Choudhury	8	All India Trinamool Congress		2015–2020
Sanjay Kumar Sharma	9	Bharatiya Janata Party		2015–2020
Krishnendu Narayan Choudhury	10	All India Trinamool Congress		2015–2020
Rajashree Dey	11	All India Trinamool Congress		2015–2020
Prasenjit Das (Pappu)	12	All India Trinamool Congress		2015–2020
Amlan Bhaduri (Buro)	13	All India Trinamool Congress		2015–2020
Sampa Saha (Basak)	14	Bharatiya Janata Party		2015–2020
Nihar Ranjan Ghosh	15	IND		2015–2020
Gayetry Ghosh	16	IND		2015–2020
Subhamay Basu (Bubai)	17	All India Trinamool Congress		2015–2020
Ashis Kundu (Pata)	18	All India Trinamool Congress		2015–2020
Runu Das	19	All India Trinamool Congress		2015–2020
Dulal Sarkar (Babla)	20	All India Trinamool Congress		2015–2020
Chaitali Ghosh (Sarkar)	21	All India Trinamool Congress		2015–2020
Narendra Nath Tiwari	22	Indian National Congress		2015–2020
Barnali Haldar (Kundu)	23	Communist Party of India		2015–2020
Sutapa Das	24	Communist Party of India		2015–2020
Dulal Nandan Chaki	25	Communist Party of India		2015–2020
Anju Tiwari	26	Indian National Congress		2015–2020
Subhadeep Sanyal	27	Communist Party of India		2015–2020
Prasenjit Ghosh	28	Communist Party of India		2015–2020
Sumita Sarkar (Das)	29	All India Trinamool Congress		2015–2020

=== Councillors of E.B.M 2010-2015 ===
Name	Ward No.	Political party	Ref	Year (length)
Sandhya Das	1	Indian National Congress		2010–2015
Sumala Agarawala	2	All India Trinamool Congress		2010–2015
Krishna Mandal (Mona)	3	Indian National Congress		2010–2015
Sabari Nath Saha	4	Indian National Congress		2010–2015
Rama Prasad Banerjee	5	Indian National Congress		2010–2015
Shipra Roy	6	Revolutionary Socialist Party		2010–2015
Subrata Sardar (Barun)	7	All India Trinamool Congress		2010–2015
Jayanta Choudhury	8	Indian National Congress		2010–2015
Pratibha Singha	9	Indian National Congress		2010–2015
Krishnendu Narayan Choudhury	10	Indian National Congress		2010–2015
Sanjay Kumar De	11	Bharatiya Janata Party		2010–2015
Kakali Choudhury	12	Indian National Congress		2010–2015
Amlan Bhaduri (Buro)	13	Bharatiya Janata Party		2010–2015
Bishnu Basak (Pada)	14	Communist Party of India (Marxist)		2010–2015
Bulu Chaudhury	15	Bharatiya Janata Party		2010–2015
Nihar Ranjan Ghosh	16	IND		2010–2015
Arjun Roy	17	Communist Party of India (Marxist)		2010–2015
Ashis Kundu (Pata)	18	Indian National Congress		2010–2015
Runu Das	19	Communist Party of India (Marxist)		2010–2015
Chaitali Ghosh	20	All India Trinamool Congress		2010–2015
Dulal Sarkar (Babla)	21	All India Trinamool Congress		2010–2015
Anju Tiwari	22	Indian National Congress		2010–2015
Subhadeep Sanyal (Subho)	23	Communist Party of India		2010–2015
Sutapa Das	24	Communist Party of India		2010–2015
Chandra Das	25	Communist Party of India		2010–2015
