= Kaliachak =

- City
- Location in West Bengal, India Kaliachak (India)
- Coordinates: 24.8602°N 88.0192°E
- Country: India
- State: West Bengal
- District: Malda

Government
  - Type: Gram Panchayat (Proposed Municipality )
  - Body: Kaliachak -1 Community Development block

Area
  - Total: 5 km^{2} (1.9 sq mi)

Population (2011)
  - Total: 15,200
  - Density: 300/km^{2} (780/sq mi)

Languages
  - Official: Bengali, English
- Time zone: UTC+5:30 (IST)
- PIN: 732201
- STD/Telephone code: 03512
- Lok Sabha constituency: Maldaha Dakshin
- Vidhan Sabha constituency: Sujapur (Vidhan Sabha constituency)
- Website: malda.nic.in

Kaliachak is a town in the Kaliachak I CD block in the Malda Sadar subdivision of Malda district in the Indian state of West Bengal. Kaliachak consists of 4 Census Town Silampur, Karari Chandpur, Baliadanga and Alipur

Kaliachak is one of the biggest commercial hub in Malda district as well as North Bengal for Agriculture Business (Mango, Litchi, Silk and Jute) along with many MSMEs (Polymer Recycling, Raw Plastic Factories, Readymade Garments ) and Hub of Private Residential (Abasik) Schools.

== Geography ==
Cities, towns and locations in the southern portion of Malda district (including Kaliachak I, Kaliachak II, Kaliachak III, Manikchak and English Bazar CD blocks)
M: municipal town, CT: census town, R: rural/ urban centre, F: Facility, H: historical centre
Owing to space constraints in the small map, the actual locations in a larger map may vary slightly

=== Location ===
Kaliachak is located on the bank of the Pagla River. 24.8635°N 88.0187°E

=== Area overview ===
The area shown in the adjoining map is the physiographic sub-region known as the diara. It “is a relatively well-drained flat land formed by the fluvial deposition of newer alluvium.” Its most noteworthy feature is the Farakka Barrage across the Ganges. The area is a part of the Malda Sadar subdivision, which is an overwhelmingly rural region, but the area shown in the map has pockets of urbanization with 17 census towns, concentrated mostly in the Kaliachak I CD block. The bank of the Ganges between Bhutni and Panchanandapur (both the places are marked on the map), is the area worst hit by left bank erosion, a major problem in the Malda area. The ruins of Gauda, capital of several empires, is located in this area.

Note: The map alongside presents some of the notable locations in the area. All places marked in the map are linked in the larger full screen map.

== Civic administration ==
=== Police station ===
Kaliachak police station under Kaliachak Sub-division Police, West Bengal police Under Malda District Police .

=== CD block HQ ===
The headquarters of Kaliachak I CD block is at Kaliachak Town.

== Demographics ==
According to the 2011 Census of India, Kaliachak had a total population of 392,517 which 7447 (49%) were males and (51%) were females. Population in the age range 0–6 years was 3256. The total number of literate persons in Kaliachak was 9846 (64.91% of the population over six years).

== Transport ==
=== Road ===
Kaliachak is on National Highway 12 (old number NH 34). and it is a big junction point for North Bengal to South Bengal.

=== Rail ===
There is a station at nearby Khaltipur railway station under Malda Town Division on the New Farakka-Old Malda section of Howrah-New Jalpaiguri line. The station has a double-electric line. Howrah–Katihar Express and Howrah–Malda Town Intercity Express (via Azimganj) are important trains with stoppage.

== Education ==
Kaliachak High School is a Bengali-medium coeducational institution established in 1938. It has facilities for teaching classes V to XII. It has a playground, a library with 4675 books and 10 computers for teaching and learning purposes.

Kaliachak Girls High School is a Bengali-medium girls only institution established in 1968. It has facilities for teaching classes V to XII. It has a library with 80 books and 15 computers for teaching and learning purposes.

There are many residential schools with students from the states of West Bengal and Jharkhand. There are 26 residential boarding schools (English and Bengali medium) as per 2021.

== Healthcare ==
Kaliachak (Silampur) Rural Hospital at Kaliachak Town (with 100 beds) is the main medical facility in Kaliachak I CD Block. There are primary health centres at Sujapur (with 10 beds), Jadupur (Naoda-Jadupur PHC) (with two beds) and Pirojpur (Narayanpur PHC) (with two beds). There are three private nursing homes in a nearby town.
