= Kaliachak I =

- Community development block
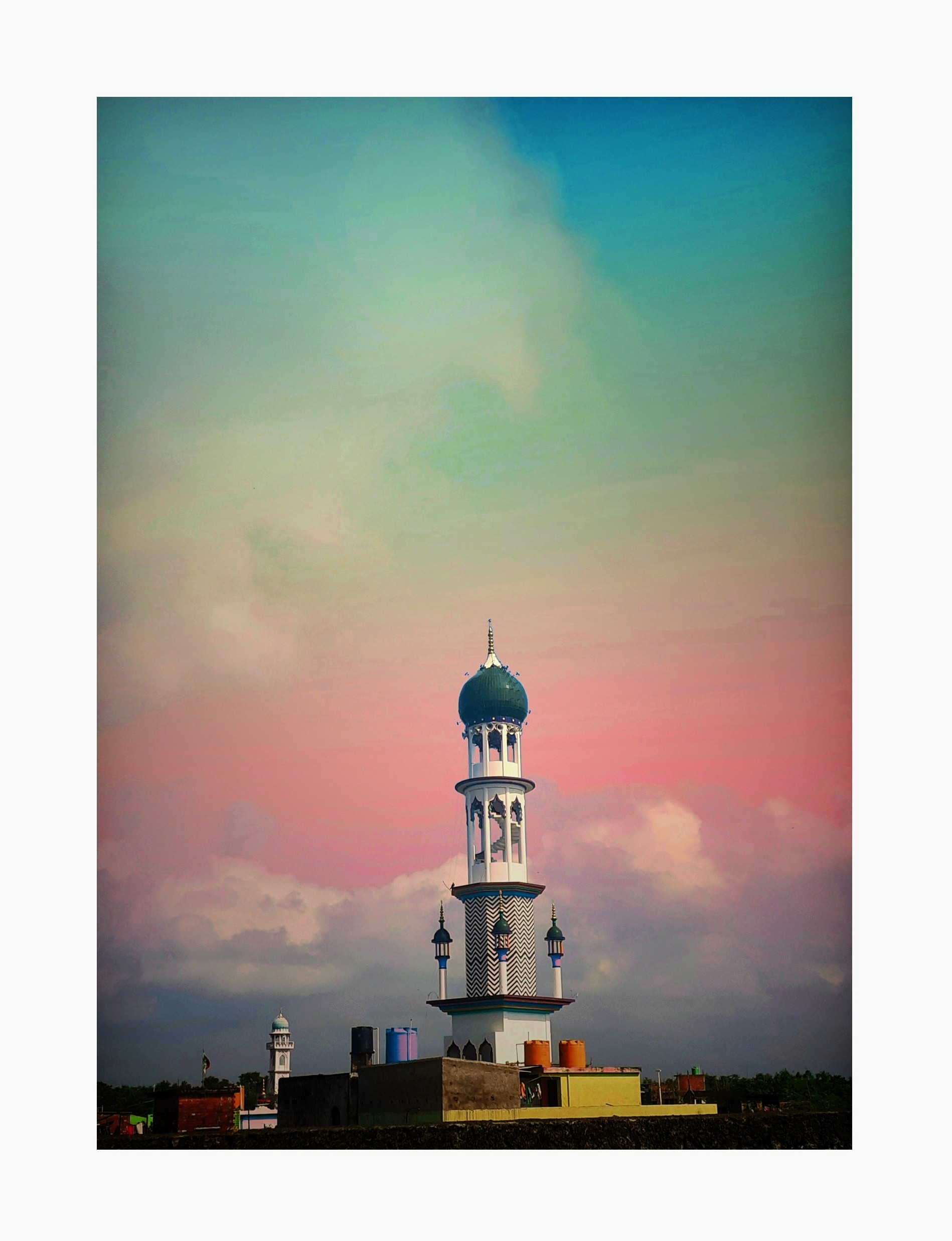
- 150-year old Minaret of Salepur Jame Mosque in Kaliachak I
- Interactive map of Kaliachak I
- Coordinates: 24.803°N 88.029°E
- Country: India
- State: West Bengal
- District: Malda

Government
  - Type: Representative democracy

Area
  - Total: 106.60 km^{2} (41.16 sq mi)

Population (2011)
  - Total: 392,517
  - Density: 3,682.1/km^{2} (9,536.7/sq mi)

Languages
  - Official: Bengali, English
- Time zone: UTC+5:30 (IST)
- PIN: 732201
- STD/ telephone code: 03512
- Lok Sabha constituency: Maldah Dakshin
- Vidhan Sabha constituency: Mothabari, Sujapur
- Website: malda.nic.in

Kaliachak I is a community development block that forms an administrative division in Malda Sadar subdivision of Malda district in the Indian state of West Bengal.

== History ==
=== Gauda and Pandua ===
Gauda was once the "capital of the ancient bhukti or political division of Bengal known as Pundravardhana which lay on the eastern extremity of the Gupta Empire." During the rule of the Sena Dynasty, in the 11th-12th century, Gauda was rebuilt and extended as Lakshmanawati (later Lakhnauti), and it became the hub of the Sena empire. Gauda was conquered by Muhammad bin Bakhtiyar Khalji in 1205. During the Turko-Afghan period, "the city of Lakhnauti or Gauda continued to function initially as their capital but was abandoned in 1342 by the Ilyas Shahi sultans in favour of Pandua because of major disturbances along the river course of the Ganga." "Pandua then lay on the banks of the Mahananda, which was the major waterway of the sultanate at the time. However, when the Mahananda too began to veer away from the site of Pandua in the mid-15th century, Gauda was rebuilt and restored to the status of capital city by the Hussain Shahi sultans"... With the ascent of Akbar to the Mughal throne at Delhi... the Mughals annexed the ancient region of Gauda in 1576 and created the Diwani of Bengal. The centre of regional power shifted across the Ganga to Rajmahal, Following the demise of the independent sultanate, the regional importance of the Gauda or Malda region declined irreversibly and the city of Gauda was eventually abandoned.

=== Malda district ===
With the advent of the British, their trading and commercial interests focused on the new cities of Malda and English Bazar. Malda district was formed in 1813 with "some portion of outlying areas of Purnia, Dinajpur and Rajshahi districts". A separate treasury was established in 1832 and a full-fledged Magistrate and Collector was posted in 1859. Malda district was part of Rajshahi Division till 1876, when it was transferred to Bhagalpur Division, and again transferred in 1905 to Rajshahi Division. With the partition of Bengal in 1947, the Radcliffe Line placed Malda district in India, except the Nawabganj subdivision, which was placed in East Pakistan.

== Geography ==
Map

Kaliachak I community development block is located at 24°48′11″N 88°01′44″E

Kaliachak I CD Block is part of the Diara, one of the three physiographic sub-regions of the district. "The Diara is a relatively well drained flat land formed by the fluvial deposition of newer alluvium in the transitional zone between the Barind upland and the marshy Tal tract. The soil is light with sandy appearance and is very fertile. Mango gardens are common and mulberry is also grown in this natural division." It covers 32.16% of the total area of the district. 42.81% of the population of the district live in this sub-region.

Left bank erosion of the Ganges upstream of Farakka Barrage has rendered nearly 4.5 lakh people homeless in Manikchak, Kaliachak I, II and III and Ratua blocks over the last three decades of the past century. The worst hit area is between Bhutnidiara and Panchanandapore in Kaliachak II block. According to the Ganga Bhangan Pratirodh Action Nagarik Committee, 750 km^{2} area was lost in 30 years in the Manikchak and Kalichak areas.

See also - River bank erosion along the Ganges in Malda and Murshidabad districts

Kaliachak I CD Block is bounded by Kaliachak II CD Block on the north and on a part of the west, English Bazar CD Block on the east, and Kaliachak III CD Block on the south and on a part of the west.

Kaliachak I CD Block has an area of 106.60 km^{2}. It has 1 panchayat samity, 14 gram panchayats, 232 gram sansads (village councils), 66 mouzas and 49 inhabited villages. Kaliachak police station serves this block. Headquarters of this CD Block is at Kaliachak.

Gram panchayats of Kaliachak I block/ panchayat samiti are: Jaluabathal, Bamongram Mosimpur, Jalalpur, Sujapur, Gayeshbari, Nawada Jadupur, Kaliachak-I, Kaliachak-II, Kaliacahk-III, Alipur-I, Alipur-II, Mozampur, Alinagar, Silampur-I and Silampur-II.

== Demographics ==
=== Population ===
As per 2011 Census of India, Kaliachak I CD Block had a total population of 392,517, of which 269,058 were rural and 123,459 were urban. There were 200,451 (51%) males and 192,066 (49%) females. Population below 6 years was 66,018. Scheduled Castes numbered 15,033 (3.83%) and Scheduled Tribes numbered 1,542 (0.39%).

Census towns in Kaliachak I CD Block were (2011 population in brackets): Chhota Suzapur (11,216), Bara Suzapur (15,808), Chaspara (7,731), Nazirpur (8,778), Jalalpur (5,460), Bamangram (13,550), Jadupur (7,585), Silampur (12,664), Baliadanga (12,379), Alipur (17,347) and Karari Chandpur(10,949).

Large villages (with 4,000+ population) in Kaliachak I CD Block were (2011 population in brackets): Sultanganj (21,149), Khas Chandipur (9,629), Mahespur (12,250), Khaltipur (6,881), Bahadurpur (7,753), Krishnapur (4,953), Kaliachak (4,192), Alinagar (9,289), Nabinagar (8,259), Dalugram (7,846), Bakharpur (12,148), Masimpur (9,279), Gayesbari (9,745), Chhirampur (4,714), Jagadishpur (5,581), Uttar Dariapur (11,813), Azimpur (11,548), Serpur (12,838), Maksudpur (4,874), Jaluabadhal (4,787), Selimpur (6,315), Harochak (4,712), Dakshin Raypur (6,442), Dakshin Lakshmipur (12,732), Majumpur (8,158) and Kadamtala (5,781).

Decadal Population Growth Rate (%) Note: The CD Block data for 1971–1981, 1981–1991 and 1991–2001 is for Kaliachak I, II & III taken together. View chart definition.

The decadal growth of population in Kaliachak I CD Block in 2001–2011 was 26.24%. The decadal growth of population in Kaliachak PS or Kaliachak I, II & III CD Blocks taken together in 1991–2001 was 29.62%. The decadal growth of population in Kaliachak PS or Kaliachak I, II & III CD Blocks taken together in 1981-91 was 33.16% and in 1971–81 was 0.42%. The decadal growth rate of population in Malda district was as follows: 30.33% in 1951–61, 31.98% in 1961–71, 26.00% in 1971–81, 29.78% in 1981–91, 24.78% in 1991–2001 and 21.22% in 2001–11. The decadal growth rate for West Bengal in 2001–11 was 13.93%. The decadal growth rate for West Bengal was 13.93 in 2001–2011, 17.77% in 1991–2001. 24.73% in 1981–1991 and 23.17% in 1971–1981.

Malda district has the second highest decadal population growth rate, for the decade 2001–2011, in West Bengal with a figure of 21.2% which is much higher than the state average (13.8%). Uttar Dinajpur district has the highest decadal growth rate in the state with 23.2%. Decadal growth rate of population is higher than that of neighbouring Murshidabad district, which has the next highest growth rate.

Population density in the district has intensified from 162 persons per km^{2} in 1901 to 881 in 2001 (i.e., around five times), which is highest amongst the districts of North Bengal. However, unlike the densely populated southern regions of West Bengal, urbanisation remains low in Malda district. North Bengal in general, and Malda in particular, has been witness to large scale population movement from other states in India and other districts of West Bengal, as well as from outside the country. The District Human Development Report for Malda notes, "Malda district has been a principal recipient of the human migration waves of the 20th century."

There are reports of Bangladeshi infiltrators coming through the international border. Only a small portion of the border with Bangladesh has been fenced and it is popularly referred to as a porous border.

=== Literacy ===
As per the 2011 census, the total number of literates in Kaliachak I CD Block was 213,041 (65.25% of the population over 6 years) out of which males numbered 113,570 (68.13% of the male population over 6 years) and females numbered 99,471 (62.25% of the female population over 6 years). The gender disparity (the difference between female and male literacy rates) was 5.88%.

See also – List of West Bengal districts ranked by literacy rate

Literacy in CD blocks of
Malda district
Malda Sadar subdivision
Gazole – 63.07%
Bamangola – 68.09%
Habibpur – 58.81%
Old Malda – 59.61%
English Bazar – 63.03%
Manikchak – 57.77%
Kaliachak I – 65.25%
Kaliachak II – 64.89%
Kaliachak III – 54.16%
Chanchal subdivision
Harishchandrapur I – 52.47%
Harishchandrapur II – 54.34%
Chanchal I – 65.09%
Chanchal II – 57.38%
Ratua I – 60.13%
Ratua II – 56.19%
Source: 2011 Census: CD Block Wise
Primary Census Abstract Data

=== Language and religion ===
Religion in Kaliachak I CD block (2011)
Islam	89.29%
Hinduism	10.56%
Other or not stated	0.15%

Islam is the predominant religion, accounting for nearly 90% of the population.

As per 2014 District Statistical Handbook: Malda (quoting census figures), in the 2001 census, Muslims numbered 274,825 and formed 88.39% of the population in Kaliachak I CD Block. Hindus numbered 35,896 and formed 11.54% of the population. Christians numbered 36 and formed 0.01% of the population. Others numbered 178 and formed 0.06% of the population.

Languages of Kaliachak I CD block (2011)
1. Bengali (97.1%)
2. Khotta (2.74%)
3. Others (0.14%)

At the time of the 2011 census, 97.12% of the population spoke Bengali and 2.74% Khotta as their first language.

== Rural poverty ==
As per the Human Development Report for Malda district, published in 2006, the percentage of rural families in BPL category in Kaliachak I CD Block was 20.0%, the lowest amongst the CD Blocks of Malda district and considerably lower than the district average. Official surveys have found households living in absolute poverty in Malda district to be around 39%.

According to the report, "An overwhelmingly large segment of the rural workforce depends on agriculture as its main source of livelihood, the extent of landlessness in Malda has traditionally been high because of the high densities of human settlement in the district… Although land reforms were implemented in Malda district from the time they were launched in other parts of West Bengal, their progress has been uneven across the Malda blocks… because of the overall paucity of land, the extent of ceiling-surplus land available for redistribution has never been large… The high levels of rural poverty that exist in nearly all blocks in Malda district closely reflect the livelihood crisis… "

== Economy ==
=== Livelihood ===
Livelihood
in Kaliachak I CD Block
1. Cultivators (4.48%)
2. Agricultural labourers (12.3%)
3. Household industries (30.6%)
4. Other Workers (52.6%)

In Kaliachak I CD Block in 2011, amongst the class of total workers, cultivators numbered 7,821 and formed 4.48%, agricultural labourers numbered 21,494 and formed 12.32%, household industry workers numbered 53,457 and formed 30.63% and other workers numbered 91,750 and formed 52.57%. Total workers numbered 174,522 and formed 44.46% of the total population, and non-workers numbered 217,995 and formed 55.54% of the population.

Note: In the census records a person is considered a cultivator, if the person is engaged in cultivation/ supervision of land owned by self/government/institution. When a person who works on another person's land for wages in cash or kind or share, is regarded as an agricultural labourer. Household industry is defined as an industry conducted by one or more members of the family within the household or village, and one that does not qualify for registration as a factory under the Factories Act. Other workers are persons engaged in some economic activity other than cultivators, agricultural labourers and household workers. It includes factory, mining, plantation, transport and office workers, those engaged in business and commerce, teachers, entertainment artistes and so on.

=== Infrastructure ===
There are 49 inhabited villages in Kaliachak I CD Block. All 49 villages (100%) have power supply. 48 villages (97.06%) have drinking water supply. 22 villages (44.9%) have post offices. 43 villages (87.76%) have telephones (including landlines, public call offices and mobile phones). 33 villages (67.35%) have a pucca (paved) approach road and 13 villages (26.53%) have transport communication (includes bus service, rail facility and navigable waterways). 2 villages (4.08%) have agricultural credit societies. 8 villages (16.33%) have banks.

=== Agriculture ===
"Large parts of the Diara, now the most intensely settled region within Malda, began to attract a new population from the early 20th century, after the alluvial chars exposed by the Ganga’s westward migration were opened for revenue settlement… Agricultural land in the Tal and Diara is mostly irrigated and intensively cropped and cultivated… Rainfall in the district is moderate…"

Kaliachak I CD Block had 69 fertiliser depots, 7 seed stores and 70 fair price shops in 2013–14.

In 2013–14, Kaliachak I CD Block produced 732 tonnes of Aman paddy, the main winter crop from 307 hectares, 1,937 tonnes of Boro paddy (spring crop) from 439 hectares, 45 tonnes of Aus paddy (summer crop) from 23 hectares, 6,618 tonnes of wheat from 1,961 hectares, 319 tonnes of maize from 75 hectares, 9,980 tonnes of jute from 719 hectares, 1,803 tonnes of potatoes from 58 hectares and 2,740 tonnes of sugar cane from 26 hectares. It also produced pulses and oilseeds.

In 2013–14, the total area irrigated in Kaliachak I CD Block was 3,536 hectares, out of which 312 hectares were irrigated by deep tube wells, 2,946 hectares by shallow tube wells and 278 hectares by other means.

=== Mango ===
25,500 hectares of land in Malda district produces mango varieties such as langra, himasagar, amrapali, laxmanbhog, gopalbhog and fazli. The core area of mango production is Old Malda, English Bazar and Manikchak CD Blocks, from where it has spread to Kaliachak I & II, Ratua I & II and Chanchal I CD Blocks.

=== Backward Regions Grant Fund ===
Malda district is listed as a backward region and receives financial support from the Backward Regions Grant Fund. The fund, created by the Government of India, is designed to redress regional imbalances in development. As of 2012, 272 districts across the country were listed under this scheme. The list includes 11 districts of West Bengal.

== Transport ==
In 2013–14, Kaliachak I CD Block had 2 ferry services and 3 originating/ terminating bus route.

The stations between New Farakka and Malda Town on the Howrah-New Jalpaiguri line are: Chamagram, Khaltipur, Jamirghata and Gour Malda railway station.

NH 12 (old number NH 34) passes through Kaliachak I CD Block.

== Education ==
In 2013–14, Kaliachak I CD Block had 110 primary schools with 25,787 students, 12 middle schools with 5,029 students, 11 high schools with 30,596 students and 14 higher secondary schools with 32,028 students. Kaliachak I CD Block had 1 general degree college with 5,250 students, 1 technical/ professional institution with 100 students and 508 institutions for special and non-formal education with 24,256 students.

As per the 2011 census, in Kaliachak I CD Block, amongst the 49 inhabited villages, 3 villages did not have a school, 18 villages had more than 1 primary school, 27 villages had at least 1 primary and 1 middle school and 16 villages had at least 1 middle and 1 secondary school.

Kaliachak College was established at Sultanganj, Kaliachak I, in 1995.

== Healthcare ==
In 2014, Kaliachak I CD Block had 1 rural hospital, 3 primary health centres and 2 nursing homes with total 90 beds and 11 doctors (excluding private bodies). It had 42 family welfare subcentres. 13,009 patients were treated indoor and 157,816 patients were treated outdoor in the hospitals, health centres and subcentres of the CD Block.

Silampur Rural Hospital at PO Kaliachak (with 30 beds) is the main medical facility in Kaliachak I CD Block. There are primary health centres at Sujapur (with 10 beds), Jadupur (Naoda-Jadupur PHC) (with 2 beds) and Pirojpur (Narayanpur PHC) (with 2 beds).

== See also ==
- Kaliachak (Vidhan Sabha constituency)
