= Khotta =

Khotta may refer to:

- Khotta people, an Indo-Aryan community in eastern India
- Khotta language, the language spoken by the Khotta people

== See also ==
- Khortha (disambiguation)
- Khot (disambiguation)
