= Bara Suzapur =

- Census Town
- Location in West Bengal, India Bara Suzapur (India)
- Coordinates: 24.907276°N 88.093665°E
- Country: India
- State: West Bengal
- District: Malda

Area
  - Total: 2.4036 km^{2} (0.9280 sq mi)

Population (2011)
  - Total: 15,808
  - Density: 6,576.8/km^{2} (17,034/sq mi)

Languages (For language and religion details see Kaliachak I#Language and religion)
  - Official: Bengali, English
- Time zone: UTC+5:30 (IST)
- PIN: 732206
- Telephone/ STD code: 03512
- Vehicle registration: WB
- Lok Sabha constituency: Maldaha Dakshin
- Vidhan Sabha constituency: Sujapur
- Website: malda.nic.in

Bara Suzapur is a census town in the Kaliachak I CD block in the Malda Sadar subdivision of Malda district in the state of West Bengal, India.

== Geography ==
Cities, towns and locations in the southern portion of Malda district (including Kaliachak I, Kaliachak II, Kaliachak III, Manikchak and English Bazar CD blocks)
M: municipal town, CT: census town, R: rural/ urban centre, F: Facility, H: historical centre
Owing to space constraints in the small map, the actual locations in a larger map may vary slightly

=== Location ===
Bara Suzapur is located at 24.907276°N 88.093665°E.

According to the map of Kaliachak CD block in the District Census Handbook, Maldah, 2011, Chhota Suzapur, Bara Suzapur, Chaspara, Nazirpur, Bamangram and Jalalpur form a cluster of census towns.

=== Area overview ===
The area shown in the adjoining map is the physiographic sub-region known as the diara. It "is a relatively well drained flat land formed by the fluvial deposition of newer alluvium." The most note-worthy feature is the Farakka Barrage across the Ganges. The area is a part of the Malda Sadar subdivision, which is an overwhelmingly rural region, but the area shown in the map has pockets of urbanization with 17 census towns, concentrated mostly in the Kaliachak I CD block. The bank of the Ganges between Bhutni and Panchanandapur (both the places are marked on the map), is the area worst hit by left bank erosion, a major problem in the Malda area. The ruins of Gauda, capital of several empires, is located in this area.

Note: The map alongside presents some of the notable locations in the area. All places marked in the map are linked in the larger full screen map.

== Demographics ==
According to the 2011 Census of India, Bara Suzapur had a total population of 15,808, of which 8,129 (51%) were males and 7,675 (49%) were females. Population in the age range 0–6 years was 2,509. The total number of literate persons in Bara Suzapur was 10,315 (77.56% of the population over 6 years).

== Infrastructure ==
According to the District Census Handbook, Maldah, 2011, Bara Suzapur covered an area of 2.4036 km^{2}. It had 10 km roads with open drains. The protected water-supply involved overhead tank, pressure tank, tap water from treated sources, hand pump. It had 340 domestic electric connections. Among the medical facilities it had 1 hospital (with 15 beds), 1 veterinary hospital, 8 medicine shops. Among the educational facilities, it had 1 senior secondary school in town, the nearest general degree college at Malda 12 km away. It had 2 recognised typewriting, shorthand and vocational training institutes, 2 non-formal education centres (Sarva Siksha Abhiyan). Among the social, recreational and cultural facilities, it had 1 public library. It produced resham silk, mango products, beedi. It had branch offices of 2 nationalised banks, 1 private commercial bank, 1 cooperative bank.

== Healthcare ==
There is a primary health centre, with 10 beds at Sujapur.
