= Mostaque Alam =

Indian politician

Member of the West Bengal Legislative Assembly
- In office 2001–2006
- Preceded by: Birendra Kumar Moitra, AIFB
- Succeeded by: Tajmul Hossain, TMC
- Constituency: Harishchandrapur
- In office 2016–2021
- Preceded by: Tajmul Hossain, TMC
- Succeeded by: Tajmul Hossain, TMC
- Constituency: Harishchandrapur

Personal details
- Born: 2 January 1957 (age 69) Harishchandrapur, Malda, West Bengal, India
- Party: Indian National Congress
- Spouse: Munima Alam
- Children: 2
- Profession: Social worker; Politician

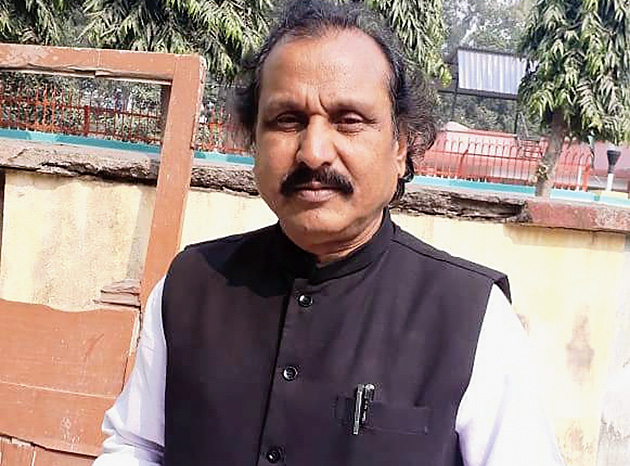
Mostaque Alam

Mostaque Alam (born 2 January 1957) is an Indian politician from the Indian National Congress who has served as MLA in the West Bengal Legislative Assembly of Harishchandrapur Assembly constituency from 2001 to 2006 and 2016 to 2021, combined for a decade.

He stepped into politics as a student leader under the leadership of the late A. B. A. Ghani Khan Choudhury and started his political career as the first elected General Secretary of Chattra Parisad Unit at Samsi College, Malda in 1975. He is a social and political worker known for his contributions to various spheres of public service. He has been actively engaged in working alongside Pranab Mukherjee, Priya Ranjan Dasmunsi, Somen Mitra and other veterans of Indian National Congress. He has been actively involved in social and political activities throughout his career. Among his notable works, he frequently files public interest litigations (PILs) to secure justice for the impoverished unrepresented. Notably, he vigorously compelled the Central Government, with the support of the Honourable Calcutta High Court, to allocate a fund of ₹3.5 lakh crores (₹3.5 trillion (US$37 billion)) for the welfare of migrant labourers. His political career is notable for his long-standing involvement with the Indian National Congress. He has held various significant positions within the party at the district and state levels.

He was the MP candidate of the INC for the seat of Maldaha Uttar, West Bengal, for the 2024 Indian general election. He placed third in the election.

== Early life and education ==
Mostaque Alam was born on 2 January 1957 to a Shershabadia family in Baghua village of Harishchandrapur, Malda, West Bengal. He completed his academic and professional qualifications with a master's degree in History and English, a Bachelor of Education (B.Ed.) with first-class honours.

== Professional life ==
Alam has served in various capacities, including being the first elected General Secretary of the Chattra Parishad unit at Samsi College, Malda. His administrative roles include being a member of the Malda Zilla Parishad and holding positions in the Harishchandrapur II Panchayat Samity.

== Political career ==
Mostaque Alam is a member of the Indian National Congress party. He has held positions within the party at the district and state levels.

=== Administrative assignments ===
- 1975 - 1978: First elected General Secretary of Chattra Parisad unit at Samsi college, Malda.
- 1983 - 1988: Member of Malda Zilla Parishad
- 1983 - 1998: Sabhapati, Harishchandrapur - II Panchayat Samity
- 1998 - 2001: Saha-Sabhapati, Harishchandrapur - II Panchayat Samity, As the post Reserved for Women
- 2001 - 2006: MLA, Harishchandrapur Assembly Constituency, West Bengal
- 2001 - 2006: Member of WAKFS Board, West Bengal
- 2008 - 2013: Karmadhakhya, ( Purto, O Paribahan S.S.) Malda Zilla Parishad
- 2016 - 2021: MLA, Harishchandrapur Assembly Constituency, Malda
- 2016 - 2021: Chairman, PLT Committee, W.B.L.A
- 2016 - 2021: Member, Standing Committee, P & R.B & S.B, West Bengal
- 2016 - 2021: Member, Standing Committee, Labour, West Bengal
- 2016 - 2021: Member, Assembly Committee, Local Fund, West Bengal
- 2016 - 2021: Member Wakfs Board, West Bengal

=== Political assignments ===
- 1977 - 1991: General Secretary District Chattra Parisad Malda
- 1991 – present: General Secretary District Congress Committee, Malda
- 2007 – present: District Spokesperson, District Congress Committee, Malda
- 1991 – present: Member of Pradesh Congress Committee, West Bengal
- 2011 - 2018: Secretary, Pradesh Congress Committee, West Bengal
- 2016 – present: Member of Pradesh Congress Executive Committee, West Bengal
- 2016 – present: Member, All India Congress Committee
- 2019 – present: President, Malda District Congress Committee
- 2020 – present: General Secretary, PCC West Bengal & Member Election Committee
- 2020 – present: State Coordinator, RGPRS, West Bengal
- 2020 – present: Working President, West Bengal Quami Tanjim

== Personal life ==
Alam is married to Munima Alam, a state government employee; they have two children.

== Social category ==
Alam belongs to the OBC-A social category with a sub-caste of Shershabadia.
