= JMQ =

JMQ can refer to:

- Jimei District, a district of Xiamen, Fujian province, China; see List of administrative divisions of Fujian
- Jamirghata railway station, a train station in Malda district, West Bengal, India, by station code
