= Jalalpur, Malda =

Jalalpur
- Census Town
- Location in West Bengal, India Jalalpur (India)
- Coordinates: 24.895276°N 88.070345°E
- Country: India
- State: West Bengal
- District: Malda

Area
  - Total: 3.0273 km^{2} (1.1688 sq mi)

Population (2011)
  - Total: 5,460
  - Density: 1,800/km^{2} (4,670/sq mi)

Languages (For language and religion details see Kaliachak I#Language and religion)
  - Official: Bengali, English
- Time zone: UTC+5:30 (IST)
- PIN: 732206
- Telephone/ STD code: 03512
- Vehicle registration: WB
- Lok Sabha constituency: Maldaha Dakshin
- Vidhan Sabha constituency: Sujapur
- Website: malda.nic.in

Jalalpur is a census town and gram panchayat in the Kaliachak I CD block in the Malda Sadar subdivision of Malda district in the state of West Bengal, India.

== Geography ==
Cities, towns and locations in the southern portion of Malda district (including Kaliachak I, Kaliachak II, Kaliachak III, Manikchak and English Bazar CD blocks)
M: municipal town, CT: census town, R: rural/ urban centre, F: Facility, H: historical centre
Owing to space constraints in the small map, the actual locations in a larger map may vary slightly

=== Location ===
Jalalpur is located at 24.895276°N 88.070345°E.

According to the map of Kaliachak CD block in the District Census Handbook, Maldah, 2011, Chhota Suzapur, Bara Suzapur, Chaspara, Nazirpur, Bamangram and Jalalpur form a cluster of census towns.

=== Area overview ===
The area shown in the adjoining map is the physiographic sub-region known as the diara. It "is a relatively well drained flat land formed by the fluvial deposition of newer alluvium." The most note-worthy feature is the Farakka Barrage across the Ganges. The area is a part of the Malda Sadar subdivision, which is an overwhelmingly rural region, but the area shown in the map has pockets of urbanization with 17 census towns, concentrated mostly in the Kaliachak I CD block. The bank of the Ganges between Bhutni and Panchanandapur (both the places are marked on the map), is the area worst hit by left bank erosion, a major problem in the Malda area. The ruins of Gauda, capital of several empires, is located in this area.

Note: The map alongside presents some of the notable locations in the area. All places marked in the map are linked in the larger full screen map.

== Demographics ==
According to the 2011 Census of India, Jalalpur had a total population of 5,460, of which 2,831 (52%) were males and 2,629 (48%) were females. Population in the age range 0–6 years was 831. The total number of literate persons in Jalalpur was 3,422 (73.93% of the population over 6 years).

== Infrastructure ==
According to the District Census Handbook, Maldah, 2011, Jalalpur covered an area of 3.0273 km^{2}. It had 13 km roads with open drains. The protected water-supply involved tap water from treated sources, uncovered well. It had 848 domestic electric connections, 9 road lighting points. Among the educational facilities, it had 2 primary schools, 1 middle school, 1 secondary school, 1 senior secondary school in town, the nearest general degree college at Malda 15 km away. It had 5 non-formal education centres (Sarva Siksha Abhiyan). It produced silk, beedi. It had branch office of 1 nationalised bank.

== Education ==
Jalalpur High School is a Bengali-medium coeducational institution established in 1973. It has facilities for teaching from class V to class XII. It has a library with 700 books, and 3 computers for teaching and learning purposes.
