= Khortha =

Khortha may refer to:

- Khortha language, Indo-Aryan language of Jharkhand, India
  - Khortha cinema, Khortha-language cinema of Jharkhand
- Khortha, India, a village in Uttar Pradesh, India

== See also ==
- Khotta (disambiguation)
