= Harishchandrapur II =

- Community development block
- Interactive map of Harishchandrapur II
- Coordinates: 25.3948400°N 87.8588300°E
- Country: India
- State: West Bengal
- District: Malda

Government
  - Type: Representative democracy

Area
  - Total: 217.22 km^{2} (83.87 sq mi)

Population (2011)
  - Total: 251,345
  - Density: 1,157.1/km^{2} (2,996.9/sq mi)

Languages
  - Official: Bengali, English
- Time zone: UTC+5:30 (IST)
- PIN: 732125
- STD/telephone code: 03513
- Lok Sabha constituency: Maldaha Uttar
- Vidhan Sabha constituency: Harishchandrapur
- Website: malda.nic.in

Harishchandrapur II is a community development block that forms an administrative division in Chanchal subdivision of Malda district in the Indian state of West Bengal.

== History ==
=== Gauda and Pandua ===
Gauda was once the “capital of the ancient bhukti or political division of Bengal known as Pundravardhana which lay on the eastern extremity of the Gupta Empire.” During the rule of the Sena Dynasty, in the 11th-12th century, Gauda was rebuilt and extended as Lakshmanawati (later Lakhnauti), and it became the hub of the Sena empire. Gauda was conquered by Muhammad bin Bakhtiyar Khalji in 1205. During the Turko-Afghan period, “the city of Lakhnauti or Gauda continued to function initially as their capital but was abandoned in 1342 by the Ilyas Shahi sultans in favour of Pandua because of major disturbances along the river course of the Ganga.” “Pandua then lay on the banks of the Mahananda, which was the major waterway of the sultanate at the time. However, when the Mahananda too began to veer away from the site of Pandua in the mid-15th century, Gauda was rebuilt and restored to the status of capital city by the Hussain Shahi sultans”... With the ascent of Akbar to the Mughal throne at Delhi... the Mughals annexed the ancient region of Gauda in 1576 and created the Diwani of Bengal. The centre of regional power shifted across the Ganga to Rajmahal. Following the demise of the independent sultanate, the regional importance of the Gauda or Malda region declined irreversibly and the city of Gauda was eventually abandoned.

=== Malda district ===
With the advent of the British, their trading and commercial interests focussed on the new cities of Malda and English Bazar. Malda district was formed in 1813 with “some portion of outlying areas of Purnia, Dinajpur and Rajshahi districts”. A separate treasury was established in 1832 and a full-fledged Magistrate and Collector was posted in 1859. Malda district was part of Rajshahi Division till 1876, when it was transferred to Bhagalpur Division, and again transferred in 1905 to Rajshahi Division. With the partition of Bengal in 1947, the Radcliffe Line placed Malda district in India, except the Nawabganj subdivision, which was placed in East Pakistan.

== Geography ==
Harishchandrapur II block, is located at 25.3948400°N 87.8588300°E.

Harishchandrapur II CD Block is part of the Tal, one of the three physiographic sub-regions of the district. “The Tal region gradually slopes down towards the south-west and merges with the Diara sub-region… (it) is strewn with innumerable marshes, bils and oxbow lakes.” The sub-region largely remains submerged during the monsoons and during the dry season large sections of it turn into mud banks with many shallow marshes scattered around. With hardly any gradient the rivers crawl through the region. The Kalindri flows along the southern edge of the CD Block.

Doulatnagar, Islampur and Bhaluka gram panchayats in Harishchandrapur II CD Block are vulnerable to floods from the adjoining Mahananda and Fulahar rivers.

Harishchandrapur II CD Block is bounded by Harishchandrapur I CD Block on the north, Chanchal II CD Block on the east and a part of the south, Ratua I CD Block on the balance portion of the south and Amdabad and Pranpur CD Blocks of Katihar district in Bihar on the west.

Harishchandrapur II CD Block has an area of 217.22 km^{2}. It has 1 panchayat samity, 9 gram panchayats, 141 gram sansads (village councils), 74 mouzas and 73 inhabited villages. Harishchandrapur police station serves this block. Headquarters of this CD Block is at Khanta (Barduari).

Gram panchayats of Harischandrapur II block/ panchayat samiti are Sadlichak, Sultannagar, Malior-I, Malior-II, Chandpur (Islampur), Doulatnagar, Bhaluka, Doulatpur and Masaldah.

== Demographics ==
=== Population ===
As per 2011 Census of India, Harishchandrapur II CD Block had a total population of 251,345, all of which were rural. There were 130,367 (52%) males and 120,978 (48%) females. Population below 6 years was 43,939. Scheduled Castes numbered 32,294 (12.85%) and Scheduled Tribes numbered 7,250 (2.88%).

Large villages (with 4,000+ population) in Harishchandrapur II CD Block were (2011 population in brackets): Latasi (4,030), Mali Pakar (8,807), Daulatpur (9,565), Manoharpur (4,164), Sultan Nagar (4,606), Khanta (5,360), Datian (9,102), Uttar Kumedpur (6,006), Talgram (5,285), Talbha Kuria (8,431), Khopakati (6,003), Daulatnagar (13,235), Mihaghat (6.080), Belshur (6,570), Malior (8,941), Talashur (10,680), Talbangrua (8,235), Talgachhi (7,829), Jagannathpur (7,310), Fatepur (10,423), Bhaluka (8,076), Kariali (5,467) and Mohanpur (5,963).

Other villages in Harishchandrapur II CD Block included (2011 population in brackets): Sadichak (3,420), Chitholia (2743) and Mashaldaha (3,889) Tiorpara

Decadal Population Growth Rate (%)

View source data.

Note: The CD Block data for 1971-1981, 1981-1991 and 1991-2001 is for both Harishcahndrapur I & II taken together

The decadal growth of population in Harishchandrapur II CD Block in 2001-2011 was 26.92%. The decadal growth of population in Harishchandrapur PS or Harishchandrapur I &II CD Blocks taken together in 1991-2001 was 25.63%. The decadal growth of population in Harishchandrapur PS or Harishchandrapur I &II CD Blocks taken together in 1981-91 was 29.30% and in 1971-81 was 25.13%. The decadal growth rate of population in Malda district was as follows: 30.33% in 1951-61, 31.98% in 1961-71, 26.00% in 1971-81, 29.78% in 1981-91, 24.78% in 1991-2001 and 21.22% in 2001-11. The decadal growth rate for West Bengal in 2001-11 was 13.93%. The decadal growth rate for West Bengal was 13.93 in 2001-2011, 17.77% in 1991-2001. 24.73% in 1981-1991 and 23.17% in 1971-1981.

Malda district has the second highest decadal population growth rate, for the decade 2001-2011, in West Bengal with a figure of 21.2% which is much higher than the state average (13.8%). Uttar Dinajpur district has the highest decadal growth rate in the state with 23.2%. Decadal growth rate of population is higher than that of neighbouring Murshidabad district, which has the next highest growth rate.

Population density in the district has intensified from 162 persons per km^{2} in 1901 to 881 in 2001 (i.e., around five times), which is highest amongst the districts of North Bengal. However, unlike the densely populated southern regions of West Bengal, urbanisation remains low in Malda district. North Bengal in general, and Malda in particular, has been witness to large scale population movement from other states in India and other districts of West Bengal, as well as from outside the country. The District Human Development Report for Malda notes, “Malda district has been a principal recipient of the human migration waves of the 20th century.”

There are reports of Bangladeshi infiltrators coming through the international border. Only a small portion of the border with Bangladesh has been fenced and it is popularly referred to as a porous border.

=== Literacy ===
As per the 2011 census, the total number of literates in Harishchandrapur II CD Block was 112,698 (54.34% of the population over 6 years) out of which males numbered 61,732 (57.21% of the male population over 6 years) and females numbered 50,966 (51.23% of the female population over 6 years). The gender disparity (the difference between female and male literacy rates) was 5.98%.

See also – List of West Bengal districts ranked by literacy rate

Literacy in CD blocks of
Malda district
Malda Sadar subdivision
Gazole – 63.07%
Bamangola – 68.09%
Habibpur – 58.81%
Old Malda – 59.61%
English Bazar – 63.03%
Manikchak – 57.77%
Kaliachak I – 65.25%
Kaliachak II – 64.89%
Kaliachak III – 54.16%
Chanchal subdivision
Harishchandrapur I – 52.47%
Harishchandrapur II – 54.34%
Chanchal I – 65.09%
Chanchal II – 57.38%
Ratua I – 60.13%
Ratua II – 56.19%
Source: 2011 Census: CD Block Wise
Primary Census Abstract Data

=== Language and religion ===
Religion in Harishchandrapur II CD block (2011)
Islam	73.65%
Hinduism	26.18%
Other or not stated	0.17%

Islam is the majority religion, with 73.65% of the population. Hinduism is the second-largest religion.

As per 2014 District Statistical Handbook: Malda (quoting census figures), in the 2001 census, Muslims numbered 143,803 and formed 72.61% of the population in Harishchandrapur II CD Block. Hindus numbered 53,950 and formed 27.24% of the population. Christians numbered 86 and formed 0.04% of the population. Others numbered 200 and formed 0.11% of the population.

Languages of Harishchandrapur II CD block (2011)
1. Bengali (88.4%)
2. Khotta (5.92%)
3. Hindi (1.62%)
4. Savara (1.35%)
5. Santali (1.14%)
6. Others (1.53%)

At the time of the 2011 census, 88.44% of the population spoke Bengali, 5.92% Khotta, 1.62% Hindi, 1.35% Savara and 1.14% Santali as their first language.

== Rural poverty ==
As per the Human Development Report for Malda district, published in 2006, the percentage of rural families in BPL category in Harishchandrapur II CD Block was 50.0%. Official surveys have found households living in absolute poverty in Malda district to be around 39%.

According to the report, “An overwhelmingly large segment of the rural workforce depends on agriculture as its main source of livelihood, the extent of landlessness in Malda has traditionally been high because of the high densities of human settlement in the district… Although land reforms were implemented in Malda district from the time they were launched in other parts of West Bengal, their progress has been uneven across the Malda blocks… because of the overall paucity of land, the extent of ceiling-surplus land available for redistribution has never been large… The high levels of rural poverty that exist in nearly all blocks in Malda district closely reflect the livelihood crisis… “

== Economy ==
=== Livelihood ===
Livelihood
in Harishchandrapur II CD Block
1. Cultivators (26.1%)
2. Agricultural labourers (53.2%)
3. Household industries (2.31%)
4. Other Workers (18.4%)

In Harishchandrapur II CD Block in 2011, amongst the class of total workers, cultivators numbered 20,513 and formed 26.05%, agricultural labourers numbered 41,898 and formed 53.20%, household industry workers numbered 1,821 and formed 2.31% and other workers numbered 14,520 and formed 18.44%. Total workers numbered 78,752 and formed 31.33% of the total population, and non-workers numbered 172,593 and formed 68.67% of the population.

Note: In the census records a person is considered a cultivator, if the person is engaged in cultivation/ supervision of land owned by self/government/institution. When a person who works on another person’s land for wages in cash or kind or share, is regarded as an agricultural labourer. Household industry is defined as an industry conducted by one or more members of the family within the household or village, and one that does not qualify for registration as a factory under the Factories Act. Other workers are persons engaged in some economic activity other than cultivators, agricultural labourers and household workers. It includes factory, mining, plantation, transport and office workers, those engaged in business and commerce, teachers, entertainment artistes and so on.

=== Infrastructure ===
There are 73 inhabited villages in Harishchandrapur II CD Block. 71 (97.26%) villages have power supply. 72 villages (98.63%) have drinking water supply. 19 villages (26.03%) have post offices. 73 villages (100%) have telephones (including landlines, public call offices and mobile phones). 33 villages (45.21%) have a pucca (paved) approach road and 13 villages (17.81%) have transport communication (includes bus service, rail facility and navigable waterways). 2 villages (2.74%) have banks.

=== Agriculture ===
“Because of its alluvial soils and the abundance of rivers, large and small, Malda has been an important agricultural region since antiquity, leading to dense human settlement within the boundaries of the district. Rice yields have traditionally been high, making it the breadbasket of North Bengal. But the shifting of rivers and overall ecological change have left an inevitable stamp on the present patterns of human settlement, as a consequence of which settlement densities vary considerably across the district… Agricultural land in the Tal and Diara is mostly irrigated and intensively cropped and cultivated… Rainfall in the district is moderate…”

Harishchandrapur II CD Block had 95 fertiliser depots, 16 seed stores and 41 fair price shops in 2013-14.

In 2013-14, Harishchandrapur II CD Block produced 117,431 tonnes of Aman paddy, the main winter crop from 35,048 hectares, 27,525 tonnes of Boro paddy (spring crop) from 6,428 hectares, 41 tonnes of Aus paddy (summer crop) from 21 hectares, 5,685 tonnes of wheat from 1,788 hectares, 2,353 tonnes of maize from 617 hectares, 27,934 tonnes of jute from 1,719 hectares, 2,112 tonnes of potatoes from 66 hectares and 1,535 tonnes of sugar cane from 15 hectares. It also produced pulses and oilseeds .

In 2013-14, the total area irrigated in Harishchandrapur II CD Block was 13,900 hectares, out of which 535 hectares were irrigated by river lift irrigation, 170 hectares by deep tube wells, 12,490 hectares by shallow tube well and 705 hectares by other means.

=== Backward Regions Grant Fund ===
Malda district is listed as a backward region and receives financial support from the Backward Regions Grant Fund. The fund, created by the Government of India, is designed to redress regional imbalances in development. As of 2012, 272 districts across the country were listed under this scheme. The list includes 11 districts of West Bengal.

== Transport ==
In 2013-14, Harishchandrapur II CD Block had 7 ferry services and 2 originating/ terminating bus routes.

There are stations at Milangarh and Bhaluka Road on the Howrah–New Jalpaiguri line.

National Highway 31 passes through Harishchndrapur II CD Block.

== Education ==
In 2013-14, Harishchandrapur II CD Block had 109 primary schools with 28,907 students, 12 middle school with 2,668 students, 12 high schools with 16,431 students and 13 higher secondary schools with 19,540 students. Harishchandrapur II CD Block had 309 institutions for special and non-formal education with 16,914 students.

As per the 2011 census, in Harishchandrapur II CD Block, amongst the 73 inhabited villages, 7 villages did not have a school, 35 villages had more than 1 primary school, 31 villages had at least 1 primary and 1 middle school and 22 villages had at least 1 middle and 1 secondary school.

== Healthcare ==
In 2014, Harishchandrapur II CD Block had 1 block primary health centre and 2 primary health centres, with total 50 beds and 8 doctors (excluding private bodies). It had 33 family welfare subcentres. 7,196 patients were treated indoor and 141,022 patients were treated outdoor in the hospitals, health centres and subcentres of the CD Block.

Masaldabazar Rural Hospital at Mashaldaha, PO Kariali (with 30 beds) is the main medical facility in Harishchndrapur II CD Block. There are primary health centres at Bhaluka Bazar (Bhaluka PHC) (with 10 beds) and Hadamnagar (with 6 beds).
