= Baliadanga =

- Census Town
- Location in West Bengal, India Baliadanga (India)
- Coordinates: 24.878317°N 88.027365°E
- Country: India
- State: West Bengal
- District: Malda

Area
  - Total: 3.775 km^{2} (1.458 sq mi)
- Elevation: 29 m (95 ft)

Population (2011)
  - Total: 12,379
  - Density: 3,279/km^{2} (8,493/sq mi)

Languages (For language and religion details see Kaliachak I#Language and religion)
  - Official: Bengali, English
- Time zone: UTC+5:30 (IST)
- PIN: 732206
- Telephone/ STD code: 03512
- Vehicle registration: WB
- Lok Sabha constituency: Maldaha Dakshin
- Vidhan Sabha constituency: Sujapur
- Website: malda.nic.in

Baliadanga is a census town in the Kaliachak I CD block in the Malda Sadar subdivision of Malda district in the state of West Bengal, India.

== Geography ==
Cities, towns and locations in the southern portion of Malda district (including Kaliachak I, Kaliachak II, Kaliachak III, Manikchak and English Bazar CD blocks)
M: municipal town, CT: census town, R: rural/ urban centre, F: Facility, H: historical centre
Owing to space constraints in the small map, the actual locations in a larger map may vary slightly

=== Location ===
Baliadanga is located at 24.878317°N 88.027365°E.

According to the map of Kaliachak CD block in the District Census Handbook, Maldah, 2011, Silampur, Baliadanga, Alipur and Karari Chandpur form a cluster of census towns.

=== Area overview ===
The area shown in the adjoining map is the physiographic sub-region known as the diara. It "is a relatively well drained flat land formed by the fluvial deposition of newer alluvium." The most note-worthy feature is the Farakka Barrage across the Ganges. The area is a part of the Malda Sadar subdivision, which is an overwhelmingly rural region, but the area shown in the map has pockets of urbanization with 17 census towns, concentrated mostly in the Kaliachak I CD block. The bank of the Ganges between Bhutni and Panchanandapur (both the places are marked on the map), is the area worst hit by left bank erosion, a major problem in the Malda area. The ruins of Gauda, capital of several empires, is located in this area.

Note: The map alongside presents some of the notable locations in the area. All places marked in the map are linked in the larger full screen map.

== Demographics ==
According to the 2011 Census of India, Baliadanga had a total population of 12,379, of which 6,340 (51%) were males and 6,039 (49%) were females. Population in the age range 0–6 years was 1,706. The total number of literate persons in Baliadanga was 8,112 (76.00% of the population over 6 years).

== Infrastructure ==
According to the District Census Handbook, Maldah, 2011, Baliadanga covered an area of 3.775 km^{2}. It had 12 km roads with open drains. The protected water-supply involved service reservoir, tap water from treated sources, hand pump. It had 2,237 domestic electric connections, 30 road lighting points. Among the medical facilities it had 1 dispensary/ health centre, 1 veterinary hospital, 25 medicine shops. Among the educational facilities, it had 9 primary schools, 2 secondary schools, 2 senior secondary schools in town, the nearest general degree college at Sultanganj 3 km away. It had 1 non-formal education centre (Sarva Shiksha Abhiyan). Among the social, recreational and cultural facilities, it had 1 cinema theatre, 1 auditorium/ community hall, 1 public library, 1 reading room. It produced wooden furniture, beedi, bakery products.

== Transport ==
Khaltipur railway station, located nearby, is on the Howrah-New Jalpaiguri line.
