= Nazirpur (disambiguation) =

Nazirpur is a village in Nadia district, West Bengal, India.

Nazirpur may also refer to:

- Nazirpur Upazila, an upazila in Pirojpur District, Barisal Division, Bangladesh
- Nazirpur, Malda, a census town in Malda district, West Bengal, India
