= Tajmul Hossain =

Indian politician

Minister of State, Government of West Bengal
- Incumbent
- Assumed office 3 August 2022
- Governor: La. Ganesan; C. V. Ananda Bose
- Chief Minister: Mamata Banerjee
- Ministry: (Department of Micro, Small and Medium Enterprises & Textile govt.wb), (Minority Affairs and Madrasah Education govt.wb)
- Preceded by: Srikanta Mahata

Member of the West Bengal Legislative Assembly
- In office 2006–2016
- Preceded by: Mostaque Alam, Indian National Congress
- Succeeded by: Mostaque Alam, Indian National Congress
- Constituency: Harishchandrapur (Vidhan Sabha constituency)

Assembly Member for Harishchandrapur (Vidhan Sabha constituency)
- Incumbent
- Assumed office 2 May 2021
- Preceded by: Mostaque Alam, Indian National Congress

Personal details
- Born: 1 January 1958 (age 68) Vill+P.O-Bangrua, Harishchandrapur, PIN-732140
- Party: All India Forward Bloc, All India Trinamool Congress (Present)
- Profession: Business, Politician

Tajmul Hossain is an Indian politician who currently serves as Cabinet Minister of State in the Government of West Bengal.

== Personal life ==
Tajmul Hossain was born in Bangrua village of Harishchandrapur I community development block in Malda District, West Bengal. His father's name is Didar Hossain. He has passed H:S from Harishchandrapur High School in 1975.

== Political life ==
He has been elected as the member of the West Bengal Legislative Assembly from Harishchandrapur (Vidhan Sabha constituency). He has won the election.
