= Karari Chandpur =

- Census Town
- Location in West Bengal, India Karari Chandpur (India)
- Coordinates: 24.848517°N 88.029065°E
- Country: India
- State: West Bengal
- District: Malda

Area
  - Total: 2.4041 km^{2} (0.9282 sq mi)

Population (2011)
  - Total: 10,941
  - Density: 4,551.0/km^{2} (11,787/sq mi)

Languages (For language and religion details see Kaliachak I#Language and religion)
  - Official: Bengali, English
- Time zone: UTC+5:30 (IST)
- PIN: 732206
- Telephone/ STD code: 03512
- Vehicle registration: WB
- Lok Sabha constituency: Maldaha Dakshin
- Vidhan Sabha constituency: Sujapur
- Website: malda.nic.in

Karari Chandpur is a census town in the Kaliachak I CD block in the Malda Sadar subdivision of Malda district in the state of West Bengal, India.

== Geography ==
Cities, towns and locations in the southern portion of Malda district (including Kaliachak I, Kaliachak II, Kaliachak III, Manikchak and English Bazar CD blocks)
M: municipal town, CT: census town, R: rural/ urban centre, F: Facility, H: historical centre
Owing to space constraints in the small map, the actual locations in a larger map may vary slightly

=== Location ===
Karari Chandpur is located at 24.848517°N 88.029065°E.

According to the map of Kaliachak CD block in the District Census Handbook, Maldah, 2011, Silampur, Baliadanga, Alipur and Karari Chandpur form a cluster of census towns.

=== Area overview ===
The area shown in the adjoining map is the physiographic sub-region known as the diara. It "is a relatively well drained flat land formed by the fluvial deposition of newer alluvium." The most note-worthy feature is the Farakka Barrage across the Ganges. The area is a part of the Malda Sadar subdivision, which is an overwhelmingly rural region, but the area shown in the map has pockets of urbanization with 17 census towns, concentrated mostly in the Kaliachak I CD block. The bank of the Ganges between Bhutni and Panchanandapur (both the places are marked on the map), is the area worst hit by left bank erosion, a major problem in the Malda area. The ruins of Gauda, capital of several empires, is located in this area.

Note: The map alongside presents some of the notable locations in the area. All places marked in the map are linked in the larger full screen map.

== Demographics ==
According to the 2011 Census of India, Karari Chandpur had a total population of 10,941, of which 5,571 (51%) were males and 5,370 (49%) were females. Population in the age range 0–6 years was 1,777. The total number of literate persons in Karari Chandpur was 4,798 (52.36% of the population over 6 years).

== Infrastructure ==
According to the District Census Handbook, Maldah, 2011, Karari Chandpur covered an area of 2.4041 km^{2}. The protected water-supply involved tap water from treated sources, tube well/ bore well. It had 856 domestic electric connections. Among the educational facilities, it had 1 primary school in town, other school facilities at Kaliachak 3 km away. It had 5 non-formal education centres (Sarva Shiksha Abhiyan). It produced cocoon.

== Notable people ==
- Sabina Yeasmin, Cabinet Minister of State for Irrigation and Waterways, North Bengal Development in the Government of West Bengal
