= Mohammed Elias Razi =

Indian politician

Mohammed Elias Razi was an Indian politician from West Bengal, belonging to the Workers Party of India. He was elected four times to the West Bengal Legislative Assembly, being elected from the Harishchandrapur constituency in 1957, 1967, 1969 and 1971.

In the 1980 Indian parliamentary election WPI fielded Mohammed Elias Razi in the Raiganj Lok Sabha constituency. He obtained 13,554 votes (2.89%).
