= Khot =

Khot or KHOT may refer to:

- Khot, Armenia, a village in Armenia
- Khot Valley in northern Pakistan
  - Union Council Khot, an Administrative subdivision
- KHOT (AM), a radio station (1250 AM) licensed to Madera, California, United States
- KHOT-FM, a radio station (105.9 FM) licensed to Paradise Valley, Arizona, United States
- Memorial Field Airport in Hot Springs, Arkansas, United States

== People with the name ==
- Jehangir Khot (1913–1990), Indian cricketer
- Sadabhau Khot, Indian politician
- Subhash Khot (born 1978), Indian-American mathematician and theoretical computer scientist

== See also ==
- Khotta (disambiguation)
