= Chitholia =

Chitholia Chitholia Chithalia
- Village
- Chitholiya
- Location in West Bengal Chitholia (India)
- Coordinates: 25°23′N 87°56′E
- Country: India
- State: West Bengal
- District: Maldah

Area
  - Total: 183.72 ha (454.0 acres)
- Time zone: UTC+5:30 (IST)
- Website: http://malda.gov.in/

Chitholia or Chithalia (Bengali: চিথলিয়া) is a small village in Harishchandrapur, Malda district in the Indian state of West Bengal. It is known for Bitul Hindu Current Affairs Educational Center. It is situated on the Bagrai river. It is under Daulatpur gram panchayat.

== Education ==
Chitholia has many Primary and Higher Secondary Schools. Hindu Current Affairs is a big educational center. It is run by Bitul Ali.

== Demographics ==
The population is about 1774. The male population is about 953 and female population is about 821. Gradually the village sex ratio is increasing. Many people in belong to Other Backward classes, but few belong to Scheduled Castes.

== Geography ==
Nearby villages include Ia Bairat (North), Ilam (Northeast), Bra (South) and Doulatpur (Southwest). Chitholia's climate is tropical monsoon. December through January is cold, while April to June is hot and July to September is monsoon. Bagrai river crosses Chitholia and flooded parts in 2017 and in 1972. The soil is black.

== Politics ==
Politics in Chitholia is dominated by the All India Trinamool Congress, the Bharatiya Janata Party, the Communist Party of India (Marxist) and the Indian National Congress. A Panchyat election was held in 2018. Trinamool under Hasiman Bibi was reelected by 5 votes with an enhanced majority. She beat Communist leader Rina Bibi

== Economy ==
Chitholia is a small village with a medium level economy. About half of the people live below poverty level. Agriculture is the mainstay. Every family is connected with agriculture.

Chitholia has one bank named Llam Krisi Samabay Samity.

One third people cultivate mango.

Most residents ride two wheeler and bicycle with a few riding four wheeler.

== Culture ==
Religion is an integral part of society. Islam is the principal religion. The other main religion is Hinduism. Three mosques and two temples are present.
