= Md. Matibur Rahaman =

Indian Politician

Mohammed Matibur Rahaman

Member of the West Bengal Legislative Assembly
- Incumbent
- Assumed office 2026
- Preceded by: Tajmul Hossain
- Constituency: Harishchandrapur

Personal details
- Party: All India Trinamool Congress (until 2026); Democratic Trinamool Congress (from 2026)
- Profession: Politician, Businessman (Contractor)

Mohammed Matibur Rahaman is an Indian politician and member of the All India Trinamool Congress. He was elected as a Member of the West Bengal Legislative Assembly from the Harishchandrapur constituency in the 2026 West Bengal Legislative Assembly election. He is also a prominent figure among the people of Harishchandrapur for helping poors by fulfilling their needs. Before entering in politics he was famous in the name "GORIBER BONDHU" and still he is famous in that name after becoming MLA Harishchandrapur (WB). After becoming MLA he got more opportunity to help people.
