= Khotta Bhasha =

Language variety spoken in India

- খোট্টা ভাষা; کھوٹّا بھاشا
- Native to: India
- Region: Malda District,Uttar Dinajpur,Murshidabad,Birbhum District,West Bengal, India.
- Ethnicity: Khotta people
- Native speakers: 1 million (2020)
- Language family: Indo-European: Indo-Iranian; Indo-Aryan; Hindustani; Khotta Bhasha
- Writing system: None

Language codes
- ISO 639-3: None (mis)

Khotta Bhasha is the language variety of the Khotta people, a small group of people who inhabit in the state of West Bengal.

There is a language in Jharkhand and in western borders of West Bengal, called Khortha (sometimes it is also called Khotta) is a well established language with its own literature. But Khotta Bhasha which is spoken in West Bengal is very much different from Khortha language and has no written form.

== Geographic distribution ==
The Khotta speaking people mainly inhabit in Harishchandrapur I & II,Chanchal I & II Ratua I & II, Manikchak and Kaliachak I, II and III blocks in the district of Malda,Itahar blocks in the district of Uttar Dinajpur and Farakka, Samserganj, Suti I & II, Raghunathganj I & II blocks in the district of Murshidabad in the state of West Bengal, India. They are also found scattered in parts of Birbhum, Medinipur & Hooghly district in West Bengal and in some places of Anwara upazila of Chittagong district in Bangladesh.

== Present circumstances ==
The total speakers of Khotta Bhasha is about 10 lakhs in the state of West Bengal. But they all are bilingual and speak and learn Bengali, as Khotta Bhasha has no written form. At present the language has only an intra community conversational status. Standard Bengali is the only medium of education of Khotta People.

== Sample phrases and comparison ==
|}

Comparison of Khotta Bhasha with standard Hindi and Standard Bengali
English	Khotta Bhasha	Hindi (Standard)	Bengali (Standard)
My name is Ahmad.	মেরা/হমরা নাম আহমাদ। Mera/Hamra nam Ahmad.	मेरा नाम अहमद है। Mera nam Ahmad hai.	আমার নাম আহমাদ। Amar nam Ahmad.
I reside in Farakka.	ম্যাঁয়/হম ফরাক্কা মেঁ রহেইঁ। Maiñ/Ham Farakka meñ raheiñ.	मैं फराक्का में रहता हूँ। Main Farakka mein rahta hooñ.	আমি ফারাক্কায় থাকি। Ami Farakkay thaki.
I am feeling bad.	মিঝকো/মুঝকো/হমকো খরাপ লগে হে। Mijhko/Mujhko/Hamko kharap lage he.	मुझे बुरा लग रहा है। mujhe bura lag raha hai.	আমার খারাপ লাগছে। Amar Kharap lagche.
I am coming fast.	ম্যাঁয়/হম তুরুনি আমে হেঁ। Maiñ/Ham turuni ame heñ.	में जल्दी आ रहा हूं। Main jaldi a raha hun.	আমি তাড়াতাড়ি আসছি। Ami taratari aschi.
They will all come.	উসকে/উনসব (সবকে) আবে গা। Uske/Unsab (sabke) abe ga.	वो सब आएंगे। Vo sab aenge.	ওরা সবাই আসবে। Ora sobai asbe.
We will go tomorrow morning.	মেরে/হমসব কল বিহানে জাঙে। Mere/Hamsab kal bihane jange.	हम कल सुबह जाएंगे। Ham kal subah jaenge.	আমরা কাল সকালে/বিহানে যাবো। Amra kal sokale/bihane jabo.
You couldn't say anything!	তুম কুচ্ছু কহে/কহনে সকো নি! Tum kucchhu kahe/kahne Sako ni!	तुम कुछ कह नहीं सके! Tum kuch kah nahiñ sake!	তুমি কিছু বলতে পারলে না! Tumi kichhu bolte parle na!
Who won in the game?	খেলা মেঁ কিস্কে জিতিস? Khela meñ kiske jitis?	खेल में कौन जीता? Khel mein kaun jeeta?	খেলায় কে জিতল? Khelay ke jitlo?
What are you doing?	ত্যায় কা করে হে? Tay ka kare he?	तू क्या कर रहे है? Tu kya kar rahe hai?	তুই কী করছিস? Tui ki korchis?
Have you eaten rice?	তুম কি ভাত খালিয়ো হো? Tum ki bhat khaliyo ho?	क्या तुमने चावल खा लिया? Kya tumne chaval kha liya?	তুমি কি ভাত খেয়ে নিয়েছো? Tumi ki bhat kheye niyecho?
Why will you not go?	তুমরে/তুমসব কাহলে/কাহে জাগো নি? Tumre/Tumsab kahle/kahe jago ni?	तुमलोग कियूं नहीं जाओगे? Tumlog kiyun nahin jaoge?	তোমরা কেন যাবে না? Tomra keno jabe na?
We will not go to play now.	মেরে/হমসব অভ্ভি খেলে/খেলনে জাঙে নি। Mere/Hamsab abhbhi khele/khelne jange ni.	हम अभी खेलने नहीं जाऊंगा। Ham abhi khelne nahin jaunga.	আমরা এখন খেলতে যাব না। Amra ekhon khelte jabo na.
I will no longer eat litchis today.	ম্যাঁয়/হম আজ আর লেচু খাঙে নি। Maiñ/Ham aj ar lechu khange ni.	मैं आज और लीची नहीं खाऊंगा। Mein aj aur lichi nahin khaunga.	আমি আজ আর লিচু খাব না। Ami aj ar lichu khabo na.
He has gone for a walk along the river.	উ লদ্দিকা কাঁধি মে ঘুরে/ঘুরনে গিয়া হা। U laddika kañdhi me ghure/ghurne giya ha.	वह नदी के किनारे घूमने गया है। Vah nadi ke kinare ghumne gaya hai.	সে নদীর পাড়ে ঘুরতে গেছে। Se nodir pare ghurte geche.
I like to eat mangoes.	মিঝকো/মিঝে আম খায়মে/খানেমে খুব অচ্ছা লগেই। Mijhko/Mijhe am khayme/khaneme khub accha lagei.	मुझे आम खाना बहुत पसंद है। Mujhe am khana bahut pasand hai.	আমার আম খেতে খুব ভালো লাগে। Amar am khete khub bhalo lage.
In childhood, we used to go to bathe in the river together.	ছোটা রহতে মেরে/হমসব একসাথে লদ্দি মে লাহে জাতিঁ। Chota rahte mere/hamsab eksathe laddi me lahe jatiñ.	बचपन में हम एक साथ नदी में नहाने जाया करते थे। Bachpan mein ham ek sath nadi mein nahane jaya karte the.	ছোটবেলায় আমরা একসাথে নদীতে স্নান করতে যেতাম। Chotobelay amra eksathe nodite snan korte jetam.
