= Khotta people =

Indo-Aryan Muslim community

Khotta
খোট্টা; کھوٹّا

Total population
- c. ~1 million

Regions with significant populations
- West Bengal, India (Malda, Murshidabad, Birbhum, Medinipur)

Languages
- Khotta Bhasha (native); Standard Bengali (mostly spoken as an L2)

Religion
- Sunni Muslim

Related ethnic groups
- Bihari Muslims, Pashtuns, Bengali Muslims

The Khotta are a Sunni Muslim community that resides in the Indian state of West Bengal.

== History ==
The Khotta Muslim community trace their origins to some of the Pathan Muslim families who came and settled during the reign of Nawab Alivardi Khan from Bihar and Uttar Pradesh. Some of the Khotta community trace their origins particularly to the districts of Darbhanga and Muzaffarpur in the Bihar state. The common surnames among them are mainly Khan, Pathan, Mir, Mirza etc. Besides these titles Sheikh, Mallick etc. are also present. Their presence in Bengal dates back several decades and they are mentioned in 20th-century writer Sarat Chandra Chattopadhyay's Srikanta novel.

== Geographic distribution ==
They mainly inhabit in Kaliachak I & II, Harishandrapur, Ratua and Manikchak blocks in the district of Malda and Farakka, Samserganj, Raghunathganj and Suti blocks in the district of Murshidabad. They are also found scattered in parts of Birbhum, Medinipur and Hooghly.

== Culture ==
The people of Khotta Muslim community usually live in groups in a neighborhood or village. There a few families together form 'Samaj' or 'Dash'. The head of the society is called 'Sardar'. Besides these, there are two positions in the society called 'Maral' and 'Chharidar'. The society or people of Dash are responsible for performing all the ceremonies related to birth, marriage and death. In addition, these people of Samaj also handle family and land disputes locally.

The Khotta Muslim people are endogamous people in general but in recent times marriages happen outside their clans also. They have their own Lok sangeet, funeral rites, marriages etc. having traits and features peculiar to their community only. They have special food habits such as kadoka gillabhat, gurbhatta, chinaka gillabhat, palo etc.

== Language ==
The Khotta Muslim people speak Khotta Bhasha in their homes. Their language variety which is sort of a mixed dialect of Hindi-Urdu and Bengali. But they all are bilingual and speak & learn Bengali, as Khotta Bhasha has no written form. At present the language has only an intra community conversational status. Their medium of education is now Bengali.

== Present circumstances ==
The total population of Khotta Muslim people is about 10 lakhs in the State of West Bengal. The traditional occupation of the community is cultivation. But they have to fall back on the job of small farmers, land labourers, migrant labourers etc. for their livelihood.
