= Alipur, Malda =

Alipur
- Census Town
- Location in West Bengal, India Alipur (India) Alipur (Asia)
- Coordinates: 24.854008°N 88.0308637°E
- Country: India
- District: Malda
- State: West Bengal
- Elevation: 26 m (85 ft)

Population (2011)
  - Total: 17,347

Languages (For language and religion details see Kaliachak I#Language and religion)
  - Official: Bengali
  - Additional official: English
- PIN: 732201
- Vehicle registration: WB

Alipur is a census town in Kaliachak I CD Block of Malda Sadar subdivision in Malda district in the Indian state of West Bengal.

== Geography ==
Cities, towns and locations in the southern portion of Malda district (including Kaliachak I, Kaliachak II, Kaliachak III, Manikchak and English Bazar CD blocks)
M: municipal town, CT: census town, R: rural/ urban centre, F: Facility, H: historical centre
Owing to space constraints in the small map, the actual locations in a larger map may vary slightly

=== Location ===
Alipur is located by the coordinate 24°51′14″N 88°01′51″E

According to the map of Kaliachak CD block in the District Census Handbook, Maldah, 2011, Silampur, Baliadanga, Alipur and Karari Chandpur form a cluster of census towns.

=== Area overview ===
The area shown in the adjoining map is the physiographic sub-region known as the diara. It "is a relatively well drained flat land formed by the fluvial deposition of newer alluvium." The most note-worthy feature is the Farakka Barrage across the Ganges. The area is a part of the Malda Sadar subdivision, which is an overwhelmingly rural region, but the area shown in the map has pockets of urbanisation with 17 census towns, concentrated mostly in the Kaliachak I CD block. The bank of the Ganges between Bhutni and Panchanandapur (both the places are marked on the map), is the area worst hit by left bank erosion, a major problem in the Malda area. The ruins of Gauda, capital of several empires, is located in this area.

Note: The map alongside presents some of the notable locations in the area. All places marked in the map are linked in the larger full screen map.

== Demographics ==
According to the 2011 Census of India, Alipur had a total population of 17,347, of which 8,841 (51%) were males and 8,506 (49%) were females. Population in the age range 0–6 years was 2,772. The total number of literate persons in Alipur was 9,362 (64.23% of the population over 6 years).

== Infrastructure ==
According to the District Census Handbook, Maldah, 2011, Alipur covered an area of 1.7073 km^{2}. It had 12 km roads with open drains. The protected water-supply involved tap water from treated sources, hand pump. It had 2,767 domestic electric connections. Among the medical facilities it had 5 medicine shops. Among the educational facilities, it had 3 primary schools, 1 middle school, 1 secondary school, 2 senior secondary schools in town. It had 5 non-formal education centres (Sarva Shiksha Abhiyan). It produced beedi, cocoon. It had branch offices of 2 nationalised banks.
