= Khortha, India =

Village in Uttar Pradesh, India

Khortha is a village in Gorakhpur district in Uttar Pradesh, India It is 16 km from Gorakhpur city. It comes under Sahjanwaa election block. The village has its own Government Primary School.The village is prone to flood every year. The village has a post office catering to nearby villages as well. The village has some ancient temples of goddess Durga and their incarnations, people around here celebrate Durga puja, Lakshmi puja and chatth puja with zeal and devotion.

Most of the people of this Village are labours working in bigger cities, hence flocking at times of Durga puja and holi.
