= Jamirghata railway station =

Railway station in West Bengal

General information
- Location: Sujapur, Jamirghata, Malda district, West Bengal; India
- Coordinates: 24°55′00″N 87°04′04″E
- Elevation: 29 m (95 ft)
- System: Passenger train station
- Owner: Indian Railways
- Operator: Eastern Railway zone
- Line: Howrah–New Jalpaiguri line Rampurhat-Malda Town Section
- Platforms: 2
- Tracks: 2

Construction
- Structure type: Standard (on ground station)

Other information
- Status: Active
- Station code: JMQ
- Zone(s): Eastern Railway zone
- Division(s): Malda

History
- Former names: East Indian Railway Company

Services
Preceding station	Indian Railways	Following station
Gour Malda towards ?	Eastern Railway zone Howrah–New Jalpaiguri line	Khaltipur towards ?
Location

Jamirghata railway station is a railway station on the Howrah–New Jalpaiguri line of Malda railway division of Eastern Railway zone. It is situated beside National Highway 34 at Pratappur, Sujapur, Jamirghata of Malda district in the Indian state of West Bengal. Total 8 passenger trains stop at Jamirghata railway station.
