= Sujapur, Malda =

Sujapur
- Populated place
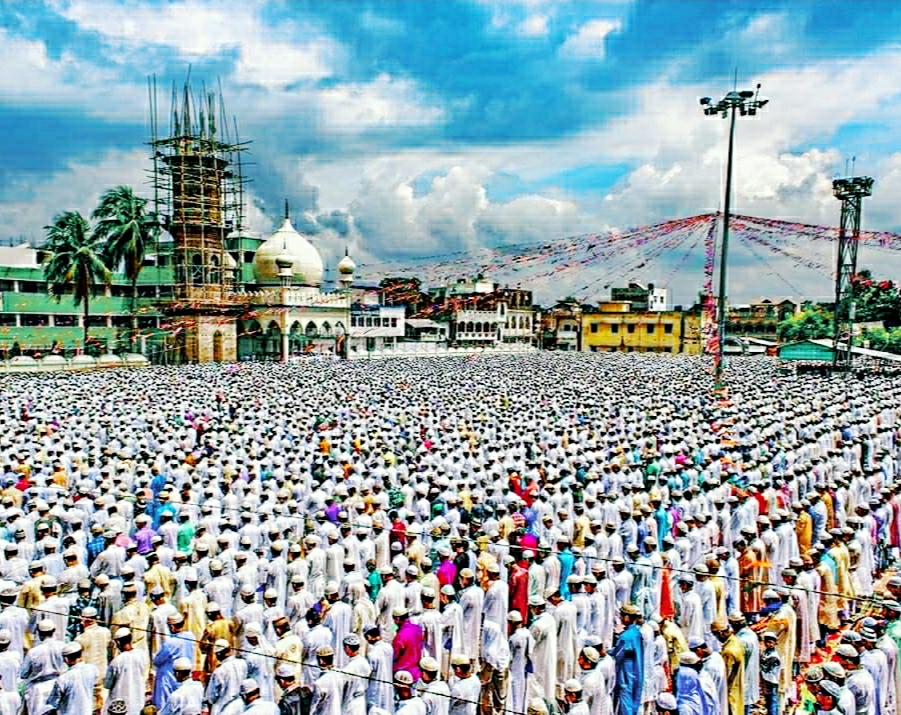
- India's largest Eid Gah Field in Sujapur

- Location in West Bengal, India Sujapur (India) Sujapur (Asia)
- Coordinates: 24.9095°N 88.0868°E
- Country: India
- State: West Bengal
- District: Malda
- Division: Malda
- Railway Station: Malda Town railway station, Jamirghata Station

Government
  - Type: Block
  - Body: Kaliachak I
  - MLA: Md. Abdul Ghani
  - M.P: Isha Khan Choudhury

Area 8 km^{2}(Town)
  - Total: 12 km^{2} (4.6 sq mi)
- Elevation: 17 m (56 ft)

Population (2011)
  - Total: 93,266
  - Density: 7,800/km^{2} (20,000/sq mi)

Languages (For language and religion details see Kaliachak I#Language and religion)
  - Official: Bengali
  - Additional official: English
- Time zone: UTC+5:30 (IST)
- PIN: 732206
- Telephone code: 91-3512-2xxxxx
- Vehicle registration: WB-65/WB-66
- Lok Sabha constituency: Maldaha Dakshin
- Vidhan Sabha constituency: Sujapur
- River: Ganga River
- Website: malda.nic.in

Sujapur is a populated place in the Indian state of West Bengal that was not identified as a separate entity in the 2011 Indian census, It has the highest concentration of Muslims of any municipality or populated place in the Malda district and falls under the jurisdiction of the Kaliachak I block.

== History ==
The area was settled during the reign of Shah Jahan by Said Rai, a North Indian Kayastha.

Sujapur is expected to be part of the upcoming Nai Mouza municipal area in the Malda district, along with the villages of Bara Suzapur CT, Gayeshbari, Mosimpur, Bamangram CT, Bhakharpur, Nazirpur CT, Chhota Suzapur CT, Chaspara CT, madhugram, Baranagar, Gandharbbagram, Paharpur and Harugram English. The government has announced plans to establish a police station in the area.

== Geography ==
Sujapur is located at 24.9095°N 88.0868°E in the Malda district of West Bengal, with an average elevation of 17 metres (56 feet). It lies on the west Southern bank of the Pagla River. The climate is typically humid and tropical, with temperatures reaching up to 46 °C during the day in May and June and dropping as low as 4 °C overnight in December and January.

Presently, Sujapur does not have its own police station. The area falls under the jurisdiction of the nearby Kaliachak Police Station. Although there are discussions or proposals regarding the establishment of a new police station, its construction work has not started yet, and it is not fully operational.
