= Sultanganj, Malda =

Sultanganj
- Village
- Location in West Bengal, India Sultanganj (India)
- Coordinates: 24.854806°N 88.000565°E
- Country: India
- State: West Bengal
- District: Malda

Population (2011)
  - Total: 21,149

Languages (For language and religion details see Kaliachak I#Language and religion)
  - Official: Bengali, English
- Time zone: UTC+5:30 (IST)
- PIN: 732201
- Telephone/ STD code: 03512
- Vehicle registration: WB
- Lok Sabha constituency: Maldaha Dakshin
- Vidhan Sabha constituency: Mothabari
- Website: malda.nic.in

Sultanganj is a village in the Kaliachak I CD block in the Malda Sadar subdivision of Malda district in the state of West Bengal, India.

== Geography ==
Cities, towns and locations in the southern portion of Malda district (including Kaliachak I, Kaliachak II, Kaliachak III, Manikchak and English Bazar CD blocks)
M: municipal town, CT: census town, R: rural/ urban centre, F: Facility, H: historical centre
Owing to space constraints in the small map, the actual locations in a larger map may vary slightly

=== Location ===
Sultanganj is located at 25.854806°N 88.000565°E.

=== Area overview ===
The area shown in the adjoining map is the physiographic sub-region known as the diara. It "is a relatively well drained flat land formed by the fluvial deposition of newer alluvium." The most note-worthy feature is the Farakka Barrage across the Ganges. The area is a part of the Malda Sadar subdivision, which is an overwhelmingly rural region, but the area shown in the map has pockets of urbanization with 17 census towns, concentrated mostly in the Kaliachak I CD block. The bank of the Ganges between Bhutni and Panchanandapur (both the places are marked on the map), is the area worst hit by left bank erosion, a major problem in the Malda area. The ruins of Gauda, capital of several empires, is located in this area.

Note: The map alongside presents some of the notable locations in the area. All places marked in the map are linked in the larger full screen map.

== Demographics ==
According to the 2011 Census of India, Sultanganj had a total population of 21,149, of which 10,639 (50%) were males and 10,513 (50%) were females. Population in the age range 0–6 years was 3,932. The total number of literate persons in Sultanganj was 17,217 (51.50% of the population over 6 years).

== Education ==
Kaliachak College was established at Sultanganj in 1995. Affiliated with the University of Gour Banga, it offers honours courses in Bengali, English, Arabic, education, history, political science, geography, zoology, economics, philosophy, general courses in arts and science, and a basic course in computer education.

Tufanganj Mental Hospital was established in 2006. It is a Bengali-medium coeducational institution. It has facilities for teaching from class I to class IV.

Mazhar-Ul-Ulum High Madrasa is a Bengali-medium coeducational institution established in 1970. It has facilities for teaching from class V to class XII. It has a library with 797 books, and 11 computers for teaching and learning purposes.
