= Khaltipur railway station =

Railway station in West Bengal

General information
- Location: Khaltipur, Kaliachak, Malda district, West Bengal; India
- Coordinates: 24°52′33″N 87°01′18″E
- Elevation: 29 m (95 ft)
- System: Passenger train station
- Owner: Indian Railways
- Operator: Eastern Railway zone
- Line: Howrah–New Jalpaiguri line Rampurhat-Malda Town Section
- Platforms: 3
- Tracks: 2

Construction
- Structure type: Standard (on ground station)

Other information
- Status: Active
- Station code: KTJ
- Zone(s): Eastern Railway zone
- Division(s): Malda

History
- Former names: East Indian Railway Company

Services
Preceding station	Indian Railways	Following station
Jamirghata towards ?	Eastern Railway zone Howrah–New Jalpaiguri line	Chamagram towards ?
Location

Khaltipur Railway Station is a railway station on the Howrah–New Jalpaiguri line of the Malda railway division of Eastern Railway zone. It is situated beside National Highway 34 at Silampur, Khaltipur of the Malda district in West Bengal. There are a total 10 passenger trains stop at Khaltipur Railway Station.
