= Harishchandrapur =

- Village
- Location in West Bengal, India Harishchandrapur (India)
- Coordinates: 25.4176°N 87.8665°E
- Country: India
- State: West Bengal
- District: Malda

Languages
  - Official: Bengali
  - Additional official: English
- Time zone: UTC+5:30 (IST)
- PIN: 732125
- STD/ Telephone code: 03513
- Lok Sabha constituency: Maldaha Uttar
- Vidhan Sabha constituency: Harishchandrapur
- Website: malda.nic.in

Harishchandrapur is a village in the Harishchandrapur I CD block in the Chanchal subdivision of Malda district in the state of West Bengal, India.

== Geography ==
Cities, towns and locations in the northern portion of Malda district (including Chanchal subdivision and Old Malda, Habibpur, Bamangola and Gazole CD blocks)
M: municipal town, CT: census town, R: rural/ urban centre, F: Facility, H: historical centre
Owing to space constraints in the small map, the actual locations in a larger map may vary slightly

=== Location ===
Harishchandrapur is located at 25.4176°N 87.8665°E.

=== Area overview ===
The area shown in the adjacent map covers two physiographic regions – the Barind in the east and the tal in the west. The eastern part is comparatively high (up to 40 metres above mean sea level at places) and uneven. The soils of the eastern region are “hard salty clays of a reddish hue and the ground is baked hard as iron.” It lies to the east of the Mahananda River. The area lying to the west of the Mahananda River, the tal, is a flat low land and “is strewn with innumerable marshes, bils and oxbow lakes.” The tal area is prone to flooding by local rivers. The total area is overwhelmingly rural. There are two important historical/ archaeological sites in the area – Pandua and Jagjivanpur.

Note: The map alongside presents some of the notable locations in the area. All places marked in the map are linked in the larger full screen map.

== Civic administration ==
=== Police station ===
Harishchandrapur police station under West Bengal police has jurisdiction over Harishchandrapur I CD block.

=== CD block HQ ===
The headquarters of Harishchandrapur I CD block is at Harishchandrapur.

== Demographics ==
According to the 2011 Census of India, Dakshin Harishshandrapur had a total population of 5,635, of which 2,730 (51%) were males and 2,635 (49%) were females. Population in the age range 0–6 years was 941. The total number of literate persons in Dakshin Harishchandrapur was 1,891 (42.74% of the population over 6 years).

As per the 2011 Census of India, Uttar Harishshandrapur had a total population of 15,443, of which 7,853 (51%) were males and 7,590 (49%) were females. Population below 6 years was 1910. The total number of literates in Uttar Harishchandrapur was 8,830 (65.25% of the population over 6 years).

== Transport ==
=== Road ===
Harishchandrapur is on National Highway 31.

=== Railway ===
Harischandrapur railway station is situated on New Farakka–New Jalpaiguri line of the Katihar railway division.

== Healthcare ==
Harishchandrapur Rural Hospital at Harishchandrapur (with 65 beds) is the main medical facility in Harishchndrapur I CD block. There are primary health centres at Vingal (Bhingola PHC) (with 4 beds), Boroi (with 6 beds) and Khushida (with 10 beds).
