= Harishchandrapur Assembly constituency =

Harishchandrapur
- Constituency No. 46 for the West Bengal Legislative Assembly
- Interactive Map Outlining Harishchandrapur Assembly Constituency

Constituency details
- Country: India
- Region: East India
- State: West Bengal
- District: Malda
- Lok Sabha constituency: Maldaha Uttar
- Established: 1951
- Total electors: 252,487
- Reservation: None

Member of Legislative Assembly
- 18th West Bengal Legislative Assembly
- Incumbent Md. Matibur Rahaman
- Party: Democratic Trinamool Congress
- Elected year: 2026

Harishchandrapur Assembly constituency is an assembly constituency in Malda district in the Indian state of West Bengal.

== Overview ==
As per the orders of the Delimitation Commission, No. 46 Harishchandrapur Assembly constituency covers Harishchandrapur II community development block (CDB) and Bhingole, Harishchandrapur and Mahendrapur gram panchayats of Harischandrapur I CDB.

Harishchandrapur Assembly constituency is part of No. 7 Maldaha Uttar (Lok Sabha constituency). It was earlier part of Raiganj (Lok Sabha constituency).

== Members of the Legislative Assembly ==
Year	Name	Party
1951	Ram Hari Roy	Indian National Congress
1957	Md. Elias Razi	Independent politician
1962	Birendra Kumar Moitra	Indian National Congress
1967	Md. Elias Razi	Independent politician
1969	Md. Elias Razi	Workers Party of India
1971	Md. Elias Razi	Workers Party of India
1972	Goutam Chakravarty	Indian National Congress
1977	Birendra Kumar Moitra	Janata Party
1982	Abdul Wahed	Indian National Congress
1987	Birendra Kumar Moitra	All India Forward Bloc
1991	Birendra Kumar Moitra	All India Forward Bloc
1996	Birendra Kumar Moitra	All India Forward Bloc
2001	Mostaque Alam	Indian National Congress
2006	Tajmul Hossain	All India Forward Bloc
2011	Tajmul Hossain	All India Forward Bloc
2016	Mostaque Alam	Indian National Congress
2021	Tajmul Hossain	Trinamool Congress
2026	Md. Matibur Rahaman	Trinamool Congress

== Election results ==
=== 2026 ===
2026 West Bengal Legislative Assembly election: Harishchandrapur
Party	Candidate	Votes	%	±%
AITC	Md. Matibur Rahaman	113,104	49.80	
BJP	Ratan Das	64,833	28.55	
INC	Mostaque Alam	31,431	13.84	
LF	Khalil Sekh	12,756	5.63	
NOTA	None of the above	954	0.42	
Majority		48,271	21.35	
Turnout		227,099		
AITC hold		Swing		

=== 2021 ===
West Bengal assembly elections, 2021: Harishchandrapur constituency
Party	Candidate	Votes	%	±%
AITC	Tajmul Hossain	122,527	60.00	
BJP	Md. Matibur Rahaman	45,054	22.00	
INC	Mostaque Alam	29,396	14.00	
	Rest of the candidates + NOTA (None of the above)	~6,000	2.80	
Majority		77,473		
Turnout				
AITC gain from INC		Swing		

=== 2016 ===
West Bengal assembly elections, 2016: Harishchandrapur constituency
Party	Candidate	Votes	%	±%
INC	Alam Mostaque	95075	55.39	
AITC	Tajmul Hossain	42190	24.52	
BJP	Sanvarlal Kedia	25889	15.05	
Majority		17857		
Turnout				
INC gain from AITC		Swing		

=== 2011 ===
In the 2011 election, Tajamul Hossain of AIFB defeated his nearest rival Mostaque Alam of Congress.

West Bengal assembly elections, 2011: Harishchandrapur constituency
Party	Candidate	Votes	%	±%
AIFB	Tajmul Hossain	62,019	46.19	−0.48
INC	Mostaque Alam	59,578	44.37	−0.80
BJP	Rina Saha	6,033	4.49	
BSP	Efrajul Hoque	3,876	2.89	
Independent	Monowara Begam	1,815		
Independent	Gouri Sankar Kedia	942		
Turnout		134,263	83.63	
AIFB hold		Swing	+0.32	

=== 1977–2006 ===
In the 2006 state assembly elections Tajmul Hossain of Forward Bloc won the Harishchandrapur assembly seat defeating his nearest rival Mostaque Alam of Congress. Contests in most years were multi cornered but only winners and runners are being mentioned. Mostaque Alam of Congress defeated Birendra Kumar Maitra of Forward Bloc in 2001. Birendra Kumar Maitra of Forward Bloc defeated Mostaque Alam of Congress in 1996 and Abdul Wahed of Congress in 1991 and 1987. Abdul Wahed of Congress defeated Subhash Chaudhury of Forward Bloc in 1982. Birendra Kumar Maitra of Janata Party defeated Mohammad Elias Razi of WPI in 1977.

=== 1951–1972 ===
Goutam Chakravarty of Congress won in 1972. Md. Elias Razi of WPI/ Independent won in 1971, 1969 and 1967. Birendra Kumar Maitra of Congress won in 1962. Md. Elias Razi contesting as an independent candidate won in 1957. In independent India's first election in 1951, Ramhari Roy of Congress won the Harishchandrapur seat.
