= Malda, West Bengal =

Malda Old Malda, English Bazar
- Urban Agglomeration
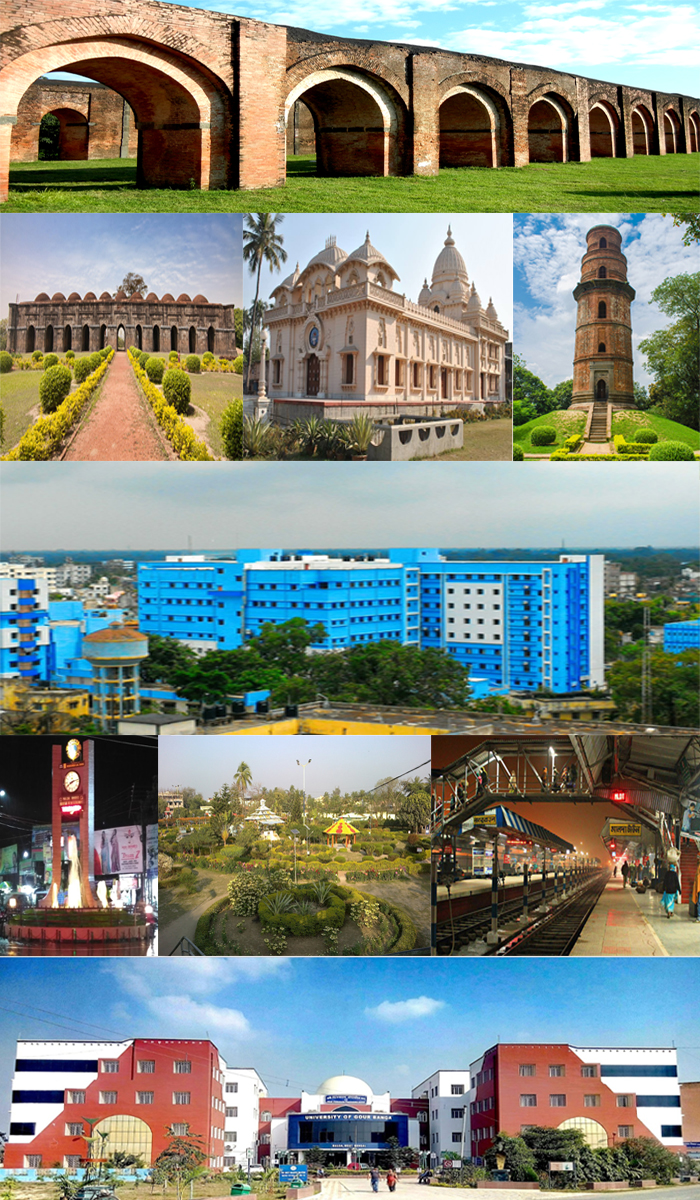
- Malda City Skyline view
- Nickname: Mango City
- Location in West Bengal, India Malda (India) Malda (Asia)
- Coordinates: 25.0119°N 88.1433°E
- Country: India
- State: West Bengal
- District: Malda
- Division: Malda
- Total wards: 49

Government
  - Type: Municipality
  - Body: English Bazar Municipality; Old Malda Municipality
  - Chairman: Amlan Bhaduri
  - District Magistrate: Rajanvir Singh Kapur, IAS
  - Superintendent of Police: Pradeep Kumar Yadav, IPS

Area
  - Urban Agglomeration: 13.25 km^{2} (5.12 sq mi)
  - Urban: 22.79 km^{2} (8.80 sq mi)
  - Metro: 206.6 km^{2} (79.8 sq mi)
- Elevation: 17 m (56 ft)

Population (2011)
  - Urban Agglomeration: 216,083
  - Rank: 6th in West Bengal
  - Density: 16,310/km^{2} (42,240/sq mi)
  - Urban: 300,088
  - Metro: 324,237
  - City rank: 223rd in India
- Demonym: Maldabasi

Languages
  - Official: Bengali
  - Additional official: English
- Time zone: UTC+5:30 (IST)
- PIN: 732101, 732102, 732103, 732141, 732142, 732128
- Telephone code: 03512
- Vehicle registration: WB-65/WB-66
- Lok Sabha constituency: Maldaha Uttar, Maldaha Dakshin
- Vidhan Sabha constituency: Malda, English Bazar
- River: Mahananda River
- Website: www.englishbazarmunicipality.com

Malda, also known as English Bazar, is a city in the Indian state of West Bengal. It is the sixth largest city (urban agglomeration) in West Bengal. It is the headquarters of the Malda district as well as of the Malda division of West Bengal. It consists of two municipalities, viz. English Bazar Municipality and Old Malda Municipality, under Malda Metropolitan Area. The city is located on the banks of the Mahananda River. Malda was an undeveloped city which was enlarging from 1925 to 1930. The city is growing rapidly nowadays with its population inching towards half a million.

== Etymology ==
The name English Bazar is a calque of Angrezābād ("English-town"), applied in the 17th century to the surroundings of the English factory. It was named in accordance with the factories built on the banks of River Mahananda by the British. The English traders set their factories here for the high profitable trade.

== Geography ==
=== Location ===
Malda is located at 25.0119°N 88.1433°E. It has an average elevation of 17 metres (56 feet). It is situated on both the western and eastern banks of the river Mahananda.

=== Climate ===
Like many other places in northern West Bengal, the weather of Malda is usually extremely humid and subtropical. Temperatures can reach as high as 42 °C (108 °F) during the day in May and June and fall as low as 8 °C (46 °F) overnight in December and January. Malda's highest recorded temperature was 45.0 °C (113.0 °F) on 27 May 1958 and lowest recorded temperature was 3.9 °C (39.0 °F) on 3 February 1905.

In Malda, the average annual temperature is 26.4 °C (79.5 °F). Precipitation is about 1,554 mm (61.2 in) per year. The driest month is December. There is 4.3 mm (0.17 in) of precipitation in December. The greatest amount of precipitation occurs in July, with an average of 352 mm (13.9 in).

Climate data for Malda (1991–2020, extremes 1901–2020)
Month	Jan	Feb	Mar	Apr	May	Jun	Jul	Aug	Sep	Oct	Nov	Dec	Year
Record high °C (°F)	32.5 (90.5)	38.7 (101.7)	41.7 (107.1)	44.1 (111.4)	45.0 (113.0)	44.4 (111.9)	39.2 (102.6)	40.0 (104.0)	40.9 (105.6)	40.5 (104.9)	34.4 (93.9)	31.7 (89.1)	45.0 (113.0)
Mean daily maximum °C (°F)	23.3 (73.9)	27.7 (81.9)	32.7 (90.9)	35.3 (95.5)	35.1 (95.2)	34.4 (93.9)	32.7 (90.9)	33.0 (91.4)	32.7 (90.9)	31.9 (89.4)	29.6 (85.3)	25.4 (77.7)	31.1 (88.0)
Mean daily minimum °C (°F)	12.3 (54.1)	15.8 (60.4)	20.1 (68.2)	23.4 (74.1)	25.1 (77.2)	26.6 (79.9)	26.9 (80.4)	27.1 (80.8)	26.5 (79.7)	24.4 (75.9)	19.5 (67.1)	14.6 (58.3)	21.8 (71.2)
Record low °C (°F)	4.1 (39.4)	3.9 (39.0)	7.2 (45.0)	11.1 (52.0)	13.7 (56.7)	18.0 (64.4)	18.5 (65.3)	19.3 (66.7)	17.9 (64.2)	11.7 (53.1)	8.3 (46.9)	5.0 (41.0)	3.9 (39.0)
Average rainfall mm (inches)	9.1 (0.36)	13.7 (0.54)	16.7 (0.66)	52.1 (2.05)	114.6 (4.51)	252.8 (9.95)	338.0 (13.31)	295.2 (11.62)	281.9 (11.10)	128.2 (5.05)	10.4 (0.41)	2.2 (0.09)	1,514.9 (59.64)
Average rainy days	0.7	1.1	1.3	3.2	6.0	11.2	14.8	14.3	12.1	4.6	0.5	0.4	70.3
Average relative humidity (%) (at 17:30 IST)	67	56	47	54	62	73	79	79	80	75	68	70	67
Source: India Meteorological Department

== Demographics ==
Religion in Malda Municipality
Religion	Percent
Hinduism	86.95%
Islam	11.02%
Christianity	0.29%
Other or not stated	1.73%

As of the 2011 census, Malda metropolitan city had a total population of 324,237.

As of the 2011 census, English Bazar municipality had a population of 216,083. The municipality had a sex ratio of 877 females per 1,000 males and 14.9% of the population were under six years old. Effective literacy was 84.69%; male literacy was 85.44% and female literacy was 83.86%.

As of 2001 India census, Old Malda Municipality had a population of 62,944. Males constitute 52% of the population and females 48%. Old Malda has an average literacy rate of 61%, higher than the national average of 59.5%: male literacy is 67%, and female literacy is 54%. In Old Malda, 15% of the population is under 6 years of age.

Religion in Old Malda Municipality
Religion	Percent
Hinduism	86.43%
Islam	13.22%
Christianity	0.11%
Other or not stated	0.22%

=== Religion ===
As of 2011 census, the majority of the population of the English Bazar municipality were Hindus with 86.95% adherents, followed by 11.02% Muslims and small populations of Sikhs and Christians.

== Civic administration ==
There are two municipalities in Malda, i.e. the English Bazar Municipality and the Old Malda Municipality.

The municipality of English Bazar is divided into 29 wards. The Trinamool Congress (with 25 councillors) holds the power in this municipality (as of 2022).

The municipality of Old Malda is divided into 20 wards.

== Culture and tourism ==
The city has a museum, Malda Museum.

== Transport ==
=== Road ===
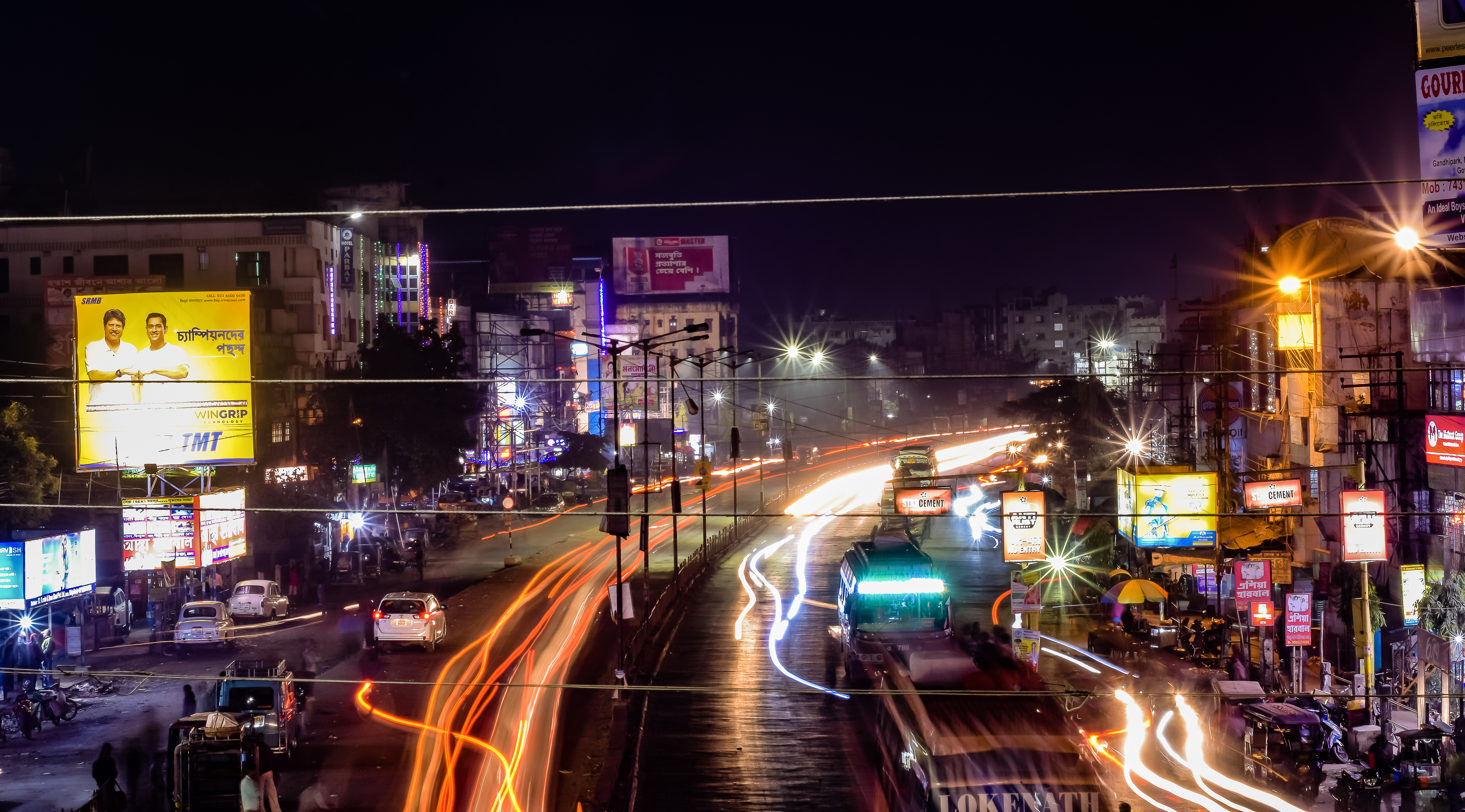
A busy Rathbari Junction Night View

NH 12 crosses through the city. The Gour Kanya Bus Terminus serves as the bus depot for both private buses and government bus service operated by the North Bengal State Transport Corporation (NBSTC).

=== Rail ===
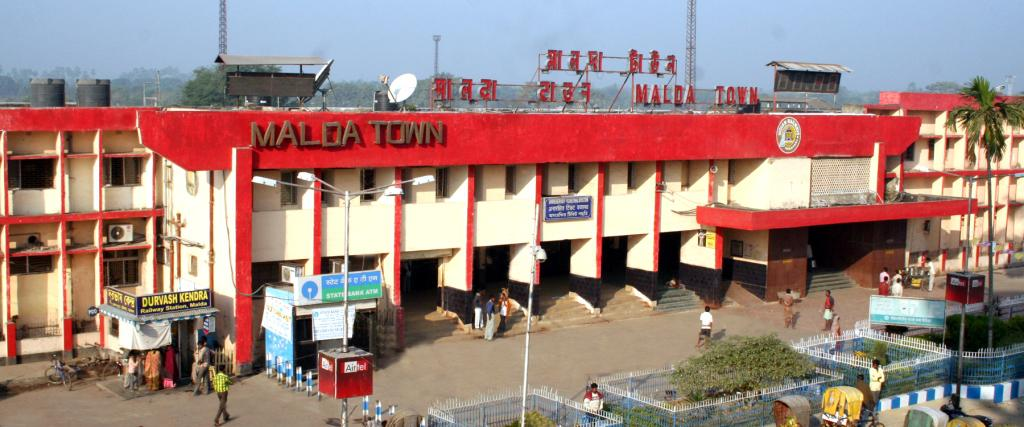
Malda Town Railway Station

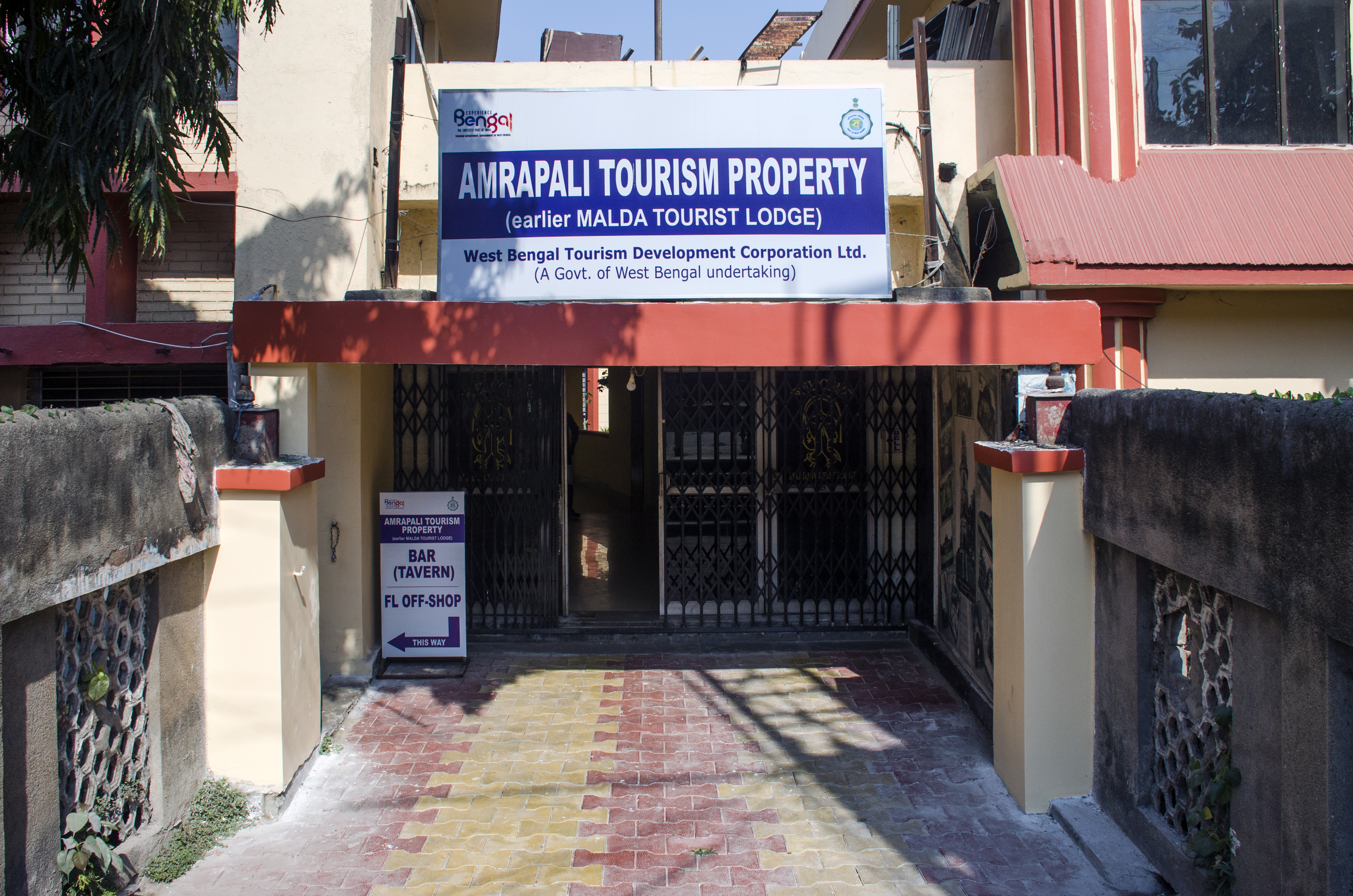
Malda Tourist Lodge (Amarapali)

There are four railway stations which serves the metropolitan city. Malda Town railway station serves the English Bazar area; Old Malda Junction serves the Old Malda area; Malda Court serves Mangalbari and Naldubi area, and Gour Malda serves Mahadipur and Gauḍa (Gour) area.

=== Air ===
Malda Airport (IATA: LDA, ICAO: VEMH) was closed in 1972 due to the Bangladesh War. Before that there were direct daily flights from Malda to Kolkata, Delhi, and Guwahati. In 2014, direct helicopter services were started between Malda and Kolkata, by the government of West Bengal.

== Education ==
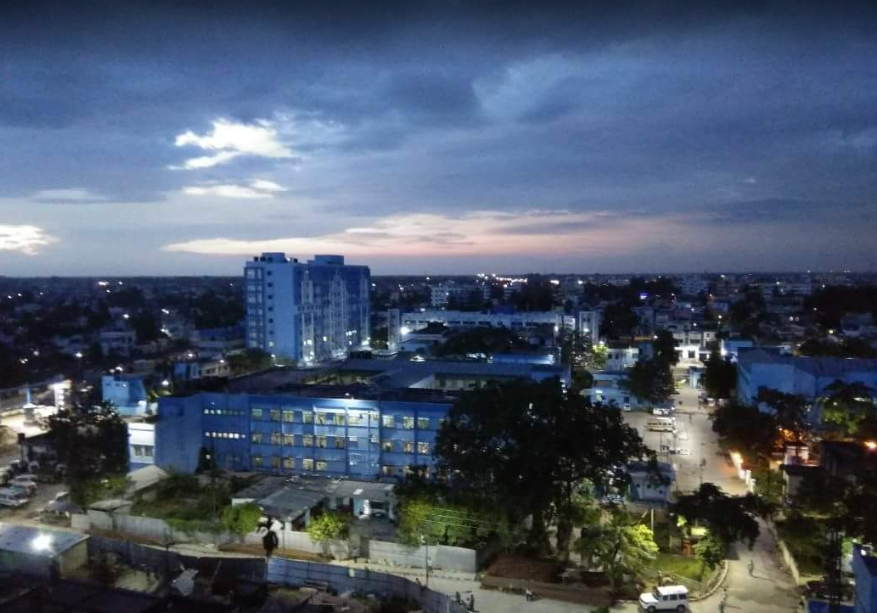
Malda Town

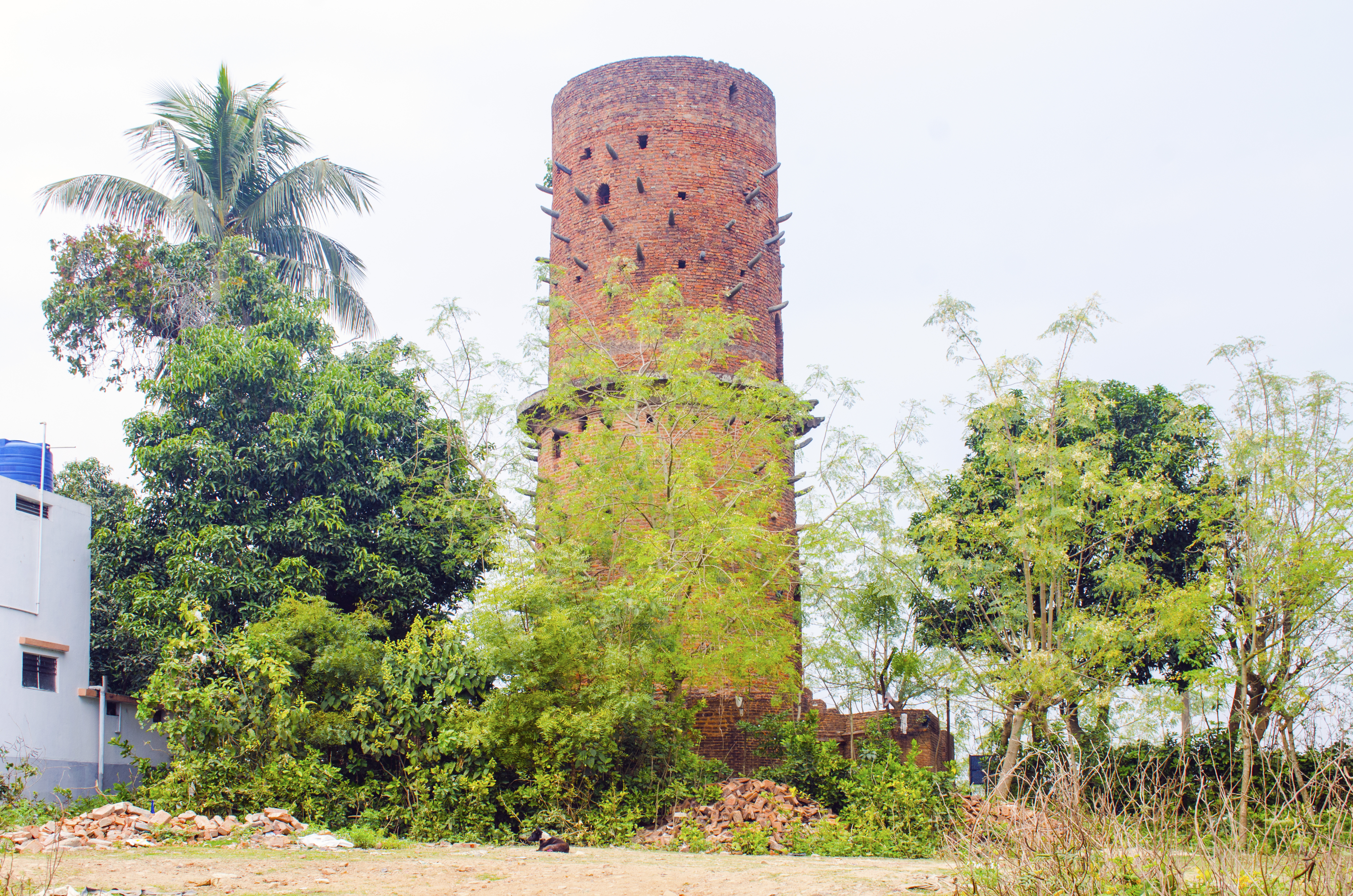
Nimasarai Minar

=== University ===
- University of Gour Banga

=== Colleges ===
General degree colleges

- Malda College
- Gour Mahavidyalaya

Engineering colleges

- Ghani Khan Choudhury Institute of Engineering & Technology (GKCIET)
- IMPS College of Engineering and Technology

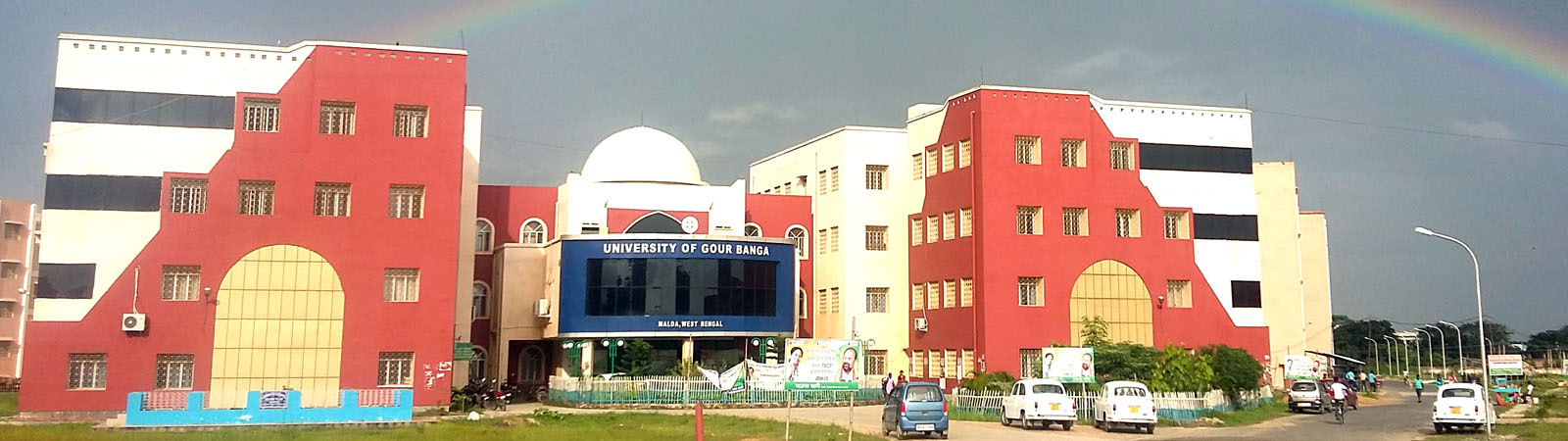
The main building of the University of Gour Banga

Medical colleges

- Malda Medical College and Hospital

=== Schools ===
Some of the notable high schools of the city include

Boys' high schools

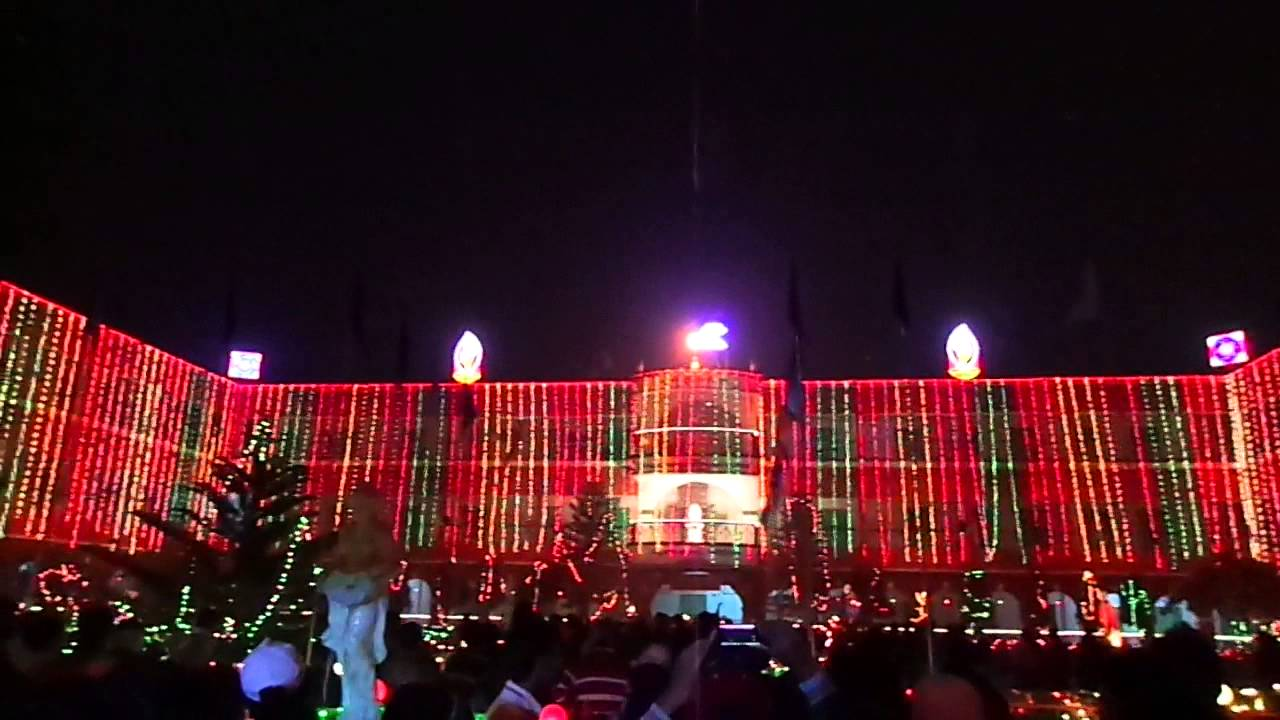
A.C. Institution during prize ceremony

- A. C. Institution
- Malda Zilla School
- Ramakrishna Mission Vivekananda Vidyamandir

Girls' high schools

- Barlow Girls' High School

== Notable people ==
- Subhamita Banerjee – Bengali singer
- Subhash Bhowmick – Indian international football player and manager
- Sandip Chakrabarti – scientist
- Shibram Chakraborty—Bengali-language humorist and story writer
- A. B. A. Ghani Khan Choudhury – politician and leader of the Indian National Congress
- Krishnendu Narayan Choudhury – politician
- Nihar Ranjan Ghosh – politician
- Khagen Murmu - politician
- Mausam Noor – politician
- Sukhendu Sekhar Roy – politician
- Uma Roy – politician
- Krishna Jiban Sanyal – freedom fighter
- Benoy Kumar Sarkar – Indian social scientist, professor and nationalist
- Santi Gopal Sen – freedom fighter and social reformer

== See also ==
- English Bazar (community development block)
- Malda Museum
- List of cities in West Bengal
- List of metropolitan area in West Bengal
