= List of metropolitan area in West Bengal =

This is a list of metropolitan cities in the state of West Bengal, India according to their population.

== List ==
Rank	City	Image	Population (2011)	Area (km²)	Density	District
1	Kolkata		14,112,536	1,888	7,482.79	Kolkata, North 24 Parganas, South 24 Parganas, Howrah, Hooghly
2	Asansol		1,243,008	1615	3,547.20	West Bardhaman
3	Siliguri		701,489	2222	5968.09	Darjeeling, Jalpaiguri
4	Durgapur		581,409	1550	3,772.66	West Bardhaman
5	Bardhaman		347,016	157	13,194.52	East Bardhaman
6	Malda		324,237	206	13,167.53	Malda
7	Berhampore		305,609	194	6,365.37	Murshidabad
8	Kharagpur		293,719	127	1,884.80	West Medinipur
9	Basirhat		206,000	56	8,400.45	North 24 Parganas
10	Haldia		200,762	198	1,841.85	East Medinipur
