= Malda Zilla School =

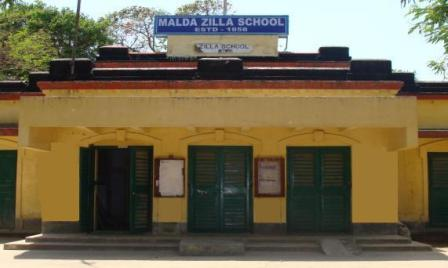
- Oldest Building of the School
- Malda City, West Bengal; India

Information
- Type: 10+2
- Established: 1858
- School board: West Bengal Board of Secondary Education; West Bengal Council of Higher Secondary Education
- School district: Malda
- Headmaster: Md. Mobassar Ansar
- Assistant Headmaster: Madhab Chandra Ghosh
- Faculty: 50+
- Grades: Class I through XII
- Enrollment: 1500 (approximate)
- Language: Bengali, English
- Campus type: Urban
- Colors: White and Khaki
- Website: www.maldazillaschool.nic.in

Malda Zilla School is the oldest school at Malda district, West Bengal, India. At present, the morning section of the school runs from Class – I to Class – V while the day section runs from Class – VI to Class – XII. In the higher secondary course, the school carries studies in all the 3 streams of study; namely the Science, Humanities and Commerce streams of study. This is one of the reputable school of the district.

== History and infrastructure ==
Established in 1858, the school started in the building in which the superintendent of police of Malda District resides at present. It all started in two and three pucca rooms and in thatched rooms. In 1897, the school shifted to the present campus having 11 compartments and a hall attached to a courtyard. Before 1985, the building was called the main building. In 1985, the building was named after an eminent student of this institute Prof. Benoy Kumar Sarkar as Binoy Sarkar Bhavan. The building is used for administrative purposes. There are 24 classrooms housed in Jagadish Chandra Bhavan, Rammohun Bhavan, Vidyasagar Bhavan and Nazrul Bhavan. From 1897 onwards, the school had two hostels – the Hindu hostel and the Muslim hostel. The two hostels have been amalgamated under the name Malda Zilla School hostel. The hostel provide accommodation to 60 students of the XI and XII standard and a few students of lower classes.

== Affiliation ==
The school is affiliated to the West Bengal Board of Secondary Education for Madhyamik and the West Bengal Council of Higher Secondary Education for higher secondary.

== Admission procedure ==
- Class I
- Through a system of lottery
- Tentative time for the distribution of admission forms: December
- Tentative time of draw: February
- Class XI

Through merit in secondary exam of applicants.

(Conducted by the school authority after publication of secondary result.)

== Co-curricular activities ==
=== Eco-club ===
Assisted by financial endowments of the Departments of Environment of both the government of India and the government of West Bengal and Paschimbanga Vijnan Mancha, the eco-club of the school undertakes activities relating to environmental issues.

=== Sports ===
The school students takes part in the soccer, cricket, Khokho and Kabhadi competitions under the guidance of the District Sports Association and the District School Sports Association. Every year, the annual sports of the school is held at Malda Zilla School Ground, and the Inter-Class WBGSTA Football Cup is held, organised by WBGSTA (West Bengal Government School Teachers' Association).

=== Science and cultural programme ===
The students take part in science and cultural contests/seminars/exhibitions not only in the school but also in the district, state and national level.

== Notable alumni ==
- Benoy Kumar Sarkar - Indian social scientist, professor, nationalist and founder of several institutes in Kolkata, including: the Bengali Institute of Sociology, Bengali Asia Academy, Bengali Dante Society, and Bengali Institute of American Culture.
- Asim Dasgupta - former Minister for Finance and Excise in the Left Front ministry in the Indian state of West Bengal.
- Subhash Bhowmick - born in West Bengal, was a retired Indian association football (soccer) international player and club level coach and manager.
- Ramesh Chandra Ghosh - MABL lawyer, politician and associate of Netaji Subhas Chandra Bose. He was imprisoned in 1942 during the Quit India Movement.
- Krishna Jiban Sanyal - an Indian revolutionary and member of the Jugantar group, Convicted in the Alipore bomb case, an associate of Aravindra Ghosh
- Santi Gopal Sen - an Indian revolutionary and member of the Bengal Volunteers group, convicted in Midnapore District in the murder of District Magistrate Bernard E. J. Burge.

== Awards ==
- In 2008, two students were awards at the Sadar Zone (English Bazar) Athletics Meet organized by DSSA (the District School Sports Association). A student secured second place in the high jump and a student secured third place in the 800 meter sprint.
- The school team has been honoured as the District Champion (Under 19 Years) in cricket consecutively for six years from 2001 to 2006 in the Dattu Fatkar CUP conducted by the DSSA (District School Sports Association).
- In 2006 the school team were Runners-up in football (Under 17 years) organized by the District School Sports Association.
- In 2005 the school team were Runners-up in kabadi (Under 19 years) organized by the District School Sports Association.
- In 2003 the school team were Runners-up in 5-Speed cricket tournament organized by the Hercules Cycle Company.
- In 1993 and 1994, a student won the Atlas Trophy in cycling.
- In 2008 the school team were Runners-up in football (Under 17 years) organized by the District School Sports Association.
