= Barlow Girls =

Barlow Girls may refer to:

- BarlowGirl, a Christian rock all-female band
- "Barlow Girls", a song by Superchick about that band from the album Karaoke Superstars
- Barlow Girls' High School in West Bengal, India
