= Ghani Khan Choudhury Institute of Engineering & Technology =

Institute of technology in West Bengal, India

- Other name: Malda Central Government Engineering College
- Motto: na hi jñānena sadṛśaṁ pavitramiha vidyate
- Motto in English: Nothing as purifying as knowledge
- Type: Government Funded Technical Institutes
- Established: 18 February 2010 (16 years ago)
- Academic affiliations: MAKAUT; AICTE; WBSCTVESD
- Budget: ₹23.67 crore (US$2.5 million) (FY2024–25 est.)
- Chairman: Prashant Pole
- Director: Siby John
- Academic staff: 64 (2025)
- Students: 1,285 (2025)
- Undergraduates: 1,285 (2025)
- Location: Narayanpur, Malda, West Bengal, India; 25°03′13″N 88°09′42″E
- Campus: Rural, 104 acres (42 ha)
- Language: English
- Website: www.gkciet.ac.in

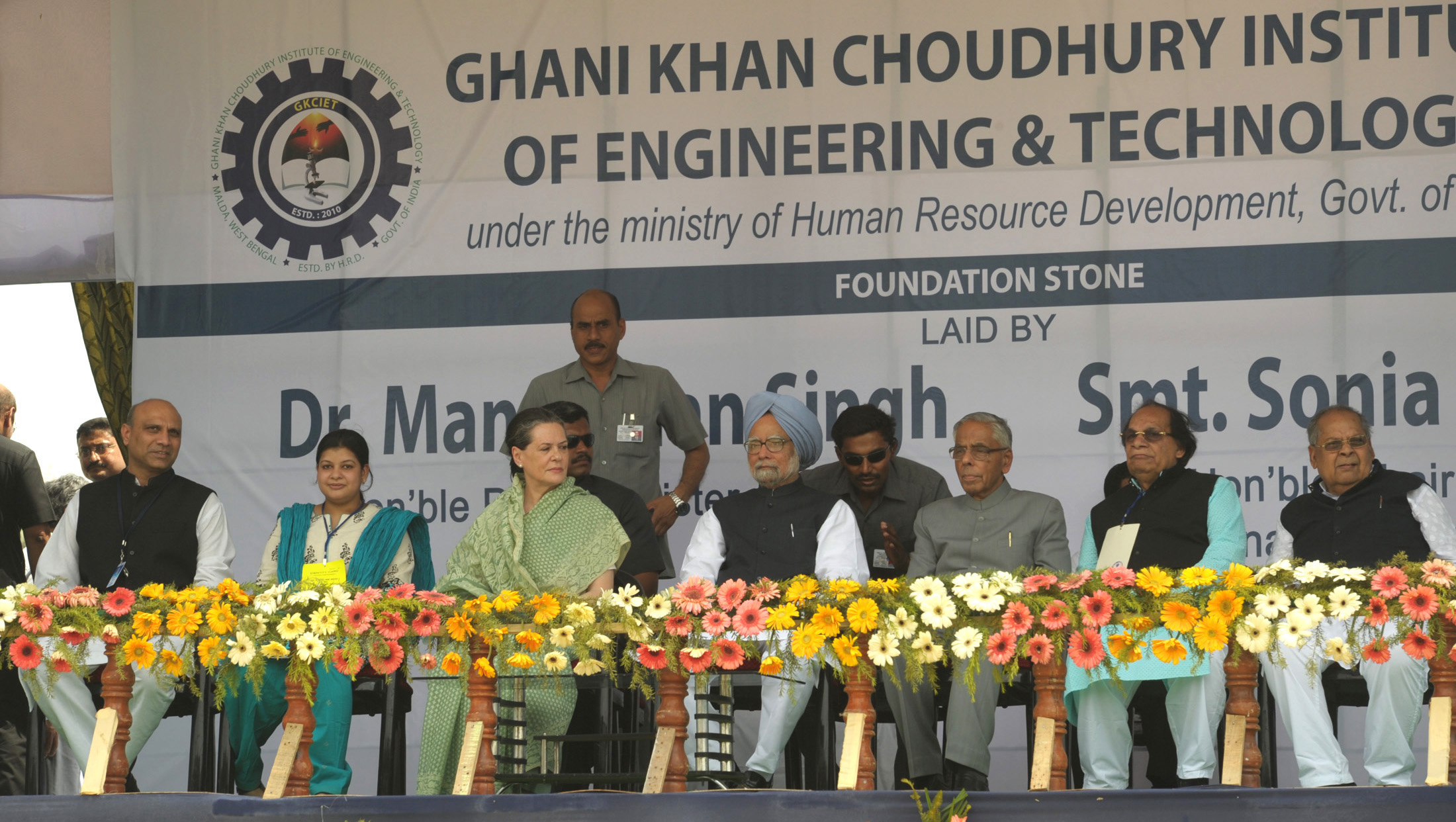
Former Prime Minister, Dr. Manmohan Singh laying the foundation stone of GKCIET

Ghani Khan Choudhury Institute of Engineering & Technology (abbr. GKCIET) is a central government funded engineering college, one of the 35 GFTIs under Ministry of the Education located in the Malda district of West Bengal, India.

On March 16, 2013, former Prime Minister Dr. Manmohan Singh officially laid the foundation stone for the Ghani Khan Choudhury Institute of Engineering and Technology in Malda. The Union Cabinet approved the establishment with an initial project outlay of ₹97 crore. Modeled after Punjab's Sant Longowal Institute of Engineering and Technology, the institution introduced a unique, multi-layered modular teaching pattern designed to offer students sequential certificate, diploma, and degree pathways to address localized deficits in technical education.

Established by the Ministry of Human Resource Development, the Institute in Malda commenced operations under institutional mentorship. The Union Government appointed the National Institute of Technology, Durgapur as the mentor institute to oversee early administrative structuring and academic development. This guidance facilitated crucial operational foundations until the institute transitioned into autonomous governance.

In June 2016, West Bengal Government sought control of the institute following intense student protests over unaccredited courses. later the institution successfully aligned its academic programs with conventional state frameworks in 2018. The West Bengal State Council for Technical and Vocational Education and Skill Development granted formal affiliation for its three-year diploma courses. Concurrently, the Maulana Abul Kalam Azad University of Technology provided official affiliation for the institute's undergraduate B.Tech programs.

Professor Parameswara Rao Alapati, a Distinguished Professor of Physics from the North Eastern Regional Institute of Science and Technology, served as the founding director, shaping the institute's initial governance. Present director of the institute is Prof. Siby John who was also a Professor Civil Engineering and former Dean at Punjab Engineering College.

Directors
- Parameswara Rao Alapati, 2017–2024; Siby John, 2024–Present

== History ==
In late 2009, India’s Ministry of Human Resource Development accelerated technical education expansion under the 11th Five-Year Plan. Central to this strategy was the Sub-Mission on Polytechnics, a centrally sponsored scheme aimed at establishing 300 institutions within historically underserved districts. To maximize geographical equity, the central government provided one-time infrastructure grants of up to ₹12.30 crore per site, while state administrations assumed responsibility for land allocation and operational costs. Integrated alongside these facilities, Modular Employable Skills frameworks offered flexible, short-term vocational pathways. This decentralized approach systematically lowered structural barriers, connecting remote student populations with targeted, industry-aligned training. Former President Pranab Mukherjee played a pivotal role in establishing Institute's facilitating administrative approvals to realize his late colleague Abu Barkat Ataur Ghani Khan Choudhury's vision for regional advancement.

== Organisation and administration ==
This Government Funded Technical Institutes is managed by a governing council headed by the Secretary of Dept. of Higher Education, Govt. of India which is the supreme decision-making body for the institute. The Governing Council consists of scientists, academics, and professors from proximate institutions.

== Academics ==
=== Academic programs ===
Ghani Khan Choudhury Institute of Engineering & Technology offers instruction in the engineering disciplines and awards the Bachelor of Technology degrees. This college offers undergraduate (B.Tech.) degree courses in.

Engineering Departments
Departments
Civil engineering
Computer science and engineering
Electrical engineering
Mechanical engineering
Food engineering
Food technology

=== Admission ===
Admission in undergraduate B.Tech. degree courses is mainly based on the result of West Bengal Joint Entrance Examination (WBJEE) and All India JEE (Main), respectively. 50% of the approved seats are filled from WBJEE examination and the rest from the All India JEE (Main).

For diploma programs, the aspirants have to qualify West Bengal JEXPO or GKCIET entrance test.

== Controversies and criticism ==
In July 2014, a legal controversy emerged regarding the land acquisition for the Institute. Allegations arose that a 1.55-acre parcel of tribal land was illegally acquired in 2010 despite a prior court injunction. Consequently, a local court directed the police to register a formal complaint against the institute's governing body chairman and others. While complainants alleged fraud, officials maintained that the property was purchased in good faith.

== See also ==
- Joint Seat Allocation Authority
- Government Funded Technical Institutes
- List of institutes funded by the government of India
- Universities and colleges of West Bengal
- List of institutions of higher education in West Bengal
