= Malda Airport =

Airport of West Bengal, India

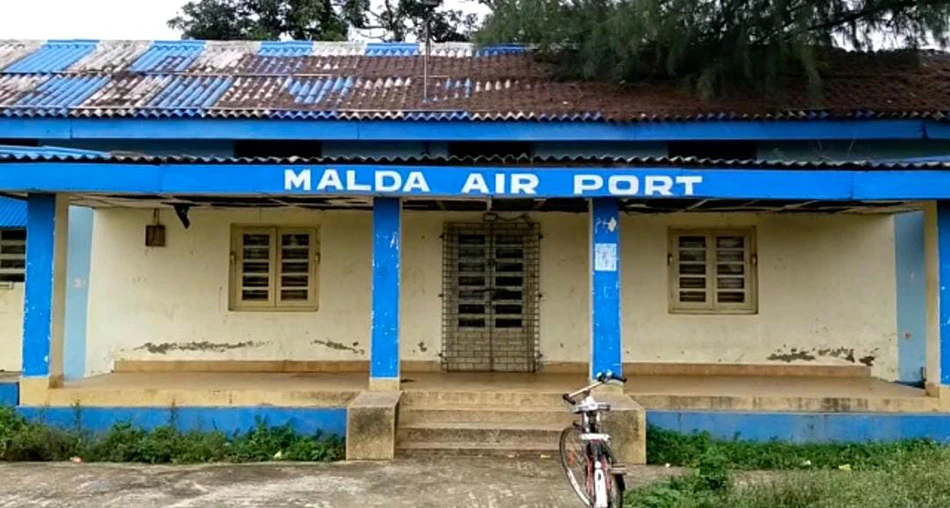
- IATA: LDA; ICAO: VEMH

Summary
- Airport type: Public
- Operator: Airports Authority of India
- Serves: English Bazar
- Location: English Bazar, India
- Elevation AMSL: 10 ft / 3 m
- Coordinates: 25.011°N 88.127°E

Map

Runways
Direction	Length		Surface
Direction	ft	m	Surface
11/29	3,600	1,097	Asphalt
- Sources

Malda Airport (IATA: LDA, ICAO: VEMH) is located at Malda, India. Situated at an elevation of 791 feet, it is 3 km from the city centre and covers a rough area of around 140 acres. It has a runway measuring 3600 by 100 feet and is unpaved. Small aircraft and helicopters can land here. The terminal was built to handle 20 passengers each on arrival and departure at a time. There were weekly services available to Kolkata and Balurghat operated by Vayudoot till 1989 when the services were withdrawn. As of 2017 the airport is under reconstruction.

== See also ==
- List of airports by ICAO code
- List of airports in India
