= Ramakrishna Mission Vivekananda Vidyamandir =

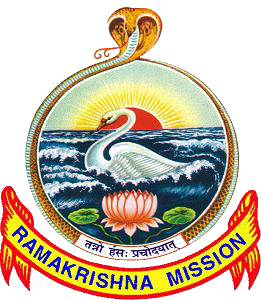
- Emblem

Location
- Malda, West Bengal; India
- Coordinates: 24.995592°N 88.147445°E

Information
- Motto: atmano mokshartham jagat hitaya cha (For one’s own salvation and for the welfare of the world)
- Religious affiliation: Hinduism
- Status: Active

Ramakrishna Mission Vivekananda Vidyamandir is a unit of Ramakrishna Mission Ashrama, in Malda district, India, which is a branch of Ramakrishna Mission. This boarding school is situated beside Ramakrishna Mission Road, South Baluchar at Malda, Malda district. It is affiliated to the West Bengal Council of Higher Secondary Education and West Bengal Board of Secondary Education. It is the first English-medium school in North Bengal run by Ramakrishna Mission.

== History ==
Ramkrishna Ashram was started in 1944 in Malda. In 1942, Swami Parashivananadaji Maharaj who came to Malda Ashram and felt the need of setting up a school in the region. By the help of local people, the institute was established on 2 January 1944. Initially it was a night school set up inside the Ashrama campus with a few students. It was started as Vivekananda Vidyamandir. In 1980 the epithet Ramakrishna Mission was added to the name. The school was awarded for good academic results in 2020.
