= Benoy Kumar Sarkar =

Indian academic (1887–1949)

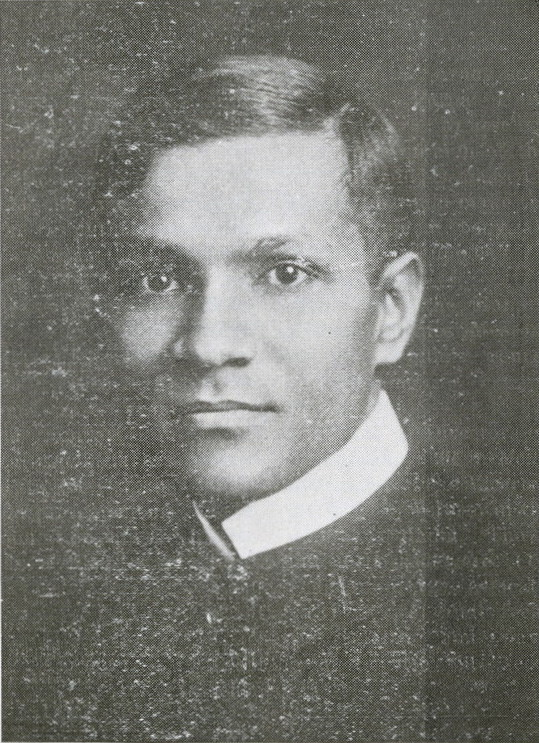
- Photo of Sarkar from the March–April 1917 issue of The Hindusthanee Student.
- Born: 26 December 1887; Malda, British India
- Died: 24 November 1949 (aged 61); Washington D.C., United States
- Occupation: Social scientist
- Spouse: Ida Sarkar
- Father: Sudhyanya Kumar Sarkar

Benoy Kumar Sarkar (sometimes Binoy Kumar Sarkar) (December 26, 1887, Malda, British India – November 23, 1949, Washington D.C., United States) was an Indian social scientist, professor, and nationalist. He founded several institutes in Calcutta, including the Bengali Institute of Sociology, Bengali Asia Academy, Bengali Dante Society, and Bengali Institute of American Culture.

== Early life and education ==
Binoy Kumar Sarkar was born in Malda Town of Malda, West Bengal, in Bengal Presidency. He started his early education in Malda Zilla School. Sarkar entered the University of Calcutta at the age of 13 after standing first at the entrance examination from Malda Zilla School, while he graduated in 1905, at 18, with dual degrees in English and history. The following year he received his master's degree.

== Career ==
In 1925 Sarkar started as a lecturer at the Department of Economics of University of Calcutta. He praised Nazism as "form of benevolent dictatorship", and advocated the establishment of a fascist dictatorship in India. In 1947, he became a professor and head of the department. In 1949, Sarkar went on a lecture tour in America, visiting 25 universities. During his trip to America, he interacted with scholars such as John Dewey, Talcott Parsons, Carle Zimmerman, and Raymond Leslie Buell.

Closely involved with the national education movement of India, Professor Sarkar was highly influenced by the Nationalist action of Sister Nivedita.

Sugata Bose writes of Sarkar's cosmopolitan visions for Asia, and his celebration of many Asian polities, "Far from harboring Hindu nationalist sentiments of the sort later propagated by V. D. Savarkar ... Sarkar was an eloquent and passionate proponent of Hindu-Muslim equality and unity. Sarkar warned Asians not to trust Western powers. Sarkar challenged the West's racial privileging of democracy:

The New Asia wants the New Europe and the New America to admit, as principle, that their peoples must not by any means command greater privileges in the Orient than the oriental peoples can possibly possess within the bounds of the Occident. ... The doctrine of international reciprocity is the first article of faith in the gospel of Young Asia. ... Young Asia wants Eur-America to realize that democratic emotions and ideals are not the monopoly of occidental race- psychology.

== Selected publications ==
Sarkar wrote in five languages, his native Bengali, English, German, French and Italian, publishing a large volume of work on a variety of topics, including 53 books and booklets in English alone, his written production amounting in all to some 30 000 pages. A complete list of his publications is contained in Bandyopadhyay's book The Political Ideas of Benoy Kumar Sarkar.

- 1914/1921 The Positive Background of Hindu Sociology
- 1916 The Beginning of Hindu Culture as World-Power (A.D. 300-600)
- 1916 Chinese Religion Through Hindu Eyes
- 1918 Hindu Achievements in Exact Science: A Study in the History of Scientific Development
- 1918 "The Influence of India on Western Civilization in Modern Times" (in The Journal of Race Development)
- 1943 The Equations of World-Economy in Their Bearing on Post-War Reconstruction

In 1919, he authored a study in the American Political Science Review presenting a "Hindu theory of international relations" which drew on thinkers such as Kautilya, Manu and Shookra, and the text of the Mahabharata. In 1921, he authored a Political Science Quarterly study presenting a "Hindu Theory of the State." According to Barry Buzan and Amitav Acharya, Sarkar's works "may be the first major IR contributions by an Indian, and one of the first modern efforts to develop an indigenous Non-Western theory of IR."

== Death ==
Sarkar died on a trip to the United States in Washington, DC, in November 1949.
