= Old Malda Municipality =

Municipal Corporation in West Bengal, India

Type
- Type: Municipality

History
- Founded: 1869; 157 years ago

Leadership
- Chairman: Bibhuti Bhusan Ghosh, AITC
- Vice Chairman: Safiqul Islam, AITC

Structure
- Seats: 20
- Political groups: Government (17): AITC (17); Opposition (2): BJP (2); Other (1): IND (1)

Elections
- Last election: 2022
- Next election: 2027

Website
- www.omm.org.in

Old Malda Municipality is responsible for the civic administration of the Old Malda area under Malda Sadar subdivision of Malda district, West Bengal, India. This municipality was established in 1869 and is one of the oldest Municipalities in India.

== Geography ==
Old Malda Municipality is located at 25.0444°N 88.1351°E in the city of Malda.

== Councillors ==
Councillor of O.M.M 2022- Incumbent

| Name | Ward No. | Political party | Ref | Year (length) |
|---|---|---|---|---|
| TAPAN CHAKRABORTY | 1 | IND | | 2022– Incumbent |
| BASANTI RAY | 2 | Bharatiya Janata Party | | 2022–Incumbent |
| SWAPNA HALDAR | 3 | Bharatiya Janata Party | | 2022–Incumbent |
| NIRMAL ADHIKARI | 4 | All India Trinamool Congress | | 2022–Incumbent |
| BASISTHA TRIBEDI | 5 | All India Trinamool Congress | | 2022–Incumbent |
| JANNATUN NESHA | 6 | All India Trinamool Congress | | 2022–Incumbent |
| SHATRUGHNA SINGH BARMA | 7 | All India Trinamool Congress | | 2022–Incumbent |
| SHYAM MANDAL | 8 | All India Trinamool Congress | | 2022–Incumbent |
| KARTICK GHOSH | 9 | All India Trinamool Congress | | 2022–Incumbent |
| FARHIN NEHAR | 10 | All India Trinamool Congress | | 2022–Incumbent |
| ASHIM GHOSH | 11 | All India Trinamool Congress | | 2022–Incumbent |
| BIBHUTI BHUSHAN GHOSH | 12 | All India Trinamool Congress | | 2022–Incumbent |
| RIMI DAS PAL | 13 | All India Trinamool Congress | | 2022–Incumbent |
| MINATI GHOSH | 14 | All India Trinamool Congress | | 2022–Incumbent |
| CHANDANA HALDAR | 15 | All India Trinamool Congress | | 2022-Incumbent |
| SIBANKAR BHATTACHARJEE | 16 | All India Trinamool Congress | | 2022–Incumbent |
| PRIYANKA CHOWDHURY (GANGULI) | 17 | All India Trinamool Congress | | 2022–Incumbent |
| RUPALI SARKAR | 18 | All India Trinamool Congress | | 2022–Incumbent |
| BISWAJIT HALDER | 19 | All India Trinamool Congress | | 2022–Incumbent |
| SAFIQUL ISLAM | 20 | All India Trinamool Congress | | 2022–Incumbent |

Councillor of O.M.M 2015-2020

| Name | Ward No. | Political party | Ref | Year (length) |
|---|---|---|---|---|
| Bebidas Chowrasia | 1 | Bharatiya Janata Party | | 2015–2020 |
| Nepal Haldar | 2 | Bharatiya Janata Party | | 2015–2020 |
| Dipti Chowdhury | 3 | All India Trinamool Congress | | 2015–2020 |
| Bibha Adhikari | 4 | All India Trinamool Congress | | 2015–2020 |
| Basistha Tribedi | 5 | IND | | 2015–2020 |
| Md. Majiful Islam | 6 | All India Trinamool Congress | | 2015–2020 |
| Gauranga Saha | 7 | Bharatiya Janata Party | | 2015–2020 |
| Anusua Das | 8 | All India Trinamool Congress | | 2015–2020 |
| Kartick Ghosh | 9 | All India Trinamool Congress | | 2015–2020 |
| Masud Hossain | 10 | All India Trinamool Congress | | 2015–2020 |
| Shilpi Ghosh | 11 | All India Trinamool Congress | | 2015–2020 |
| Shanku Sinha | 12 | All India Trinamool Congress | | 2015–2020 |
| Paritosh Ghosh | 13 | IND | | 2015–2020 |
| Soumen Sarkar | 14 | Bharatiya Janata Party | | 2015–2020 |
| Chandana Haldar | 15 | Communist Party of India | | 2015-2020 |
| Sibankar Bhattacharjee | 16 | All India Trinamool Congress | | 2015–2020 |
| Sujan Kumar Saha | 17 | Communist Party of India | | 2015–2020 |
| Rupali Sarkar | 18 | All India Trinamool Congress | | 2015–2020 |
| Nripen Paul | 19 | Bharatiya Janata Party | | 2015–2020 |
| Safiqul Islam | 20 | IND | | 2015–2020 |

Councillor of O.M.M 2010-2015

| Name | Ward No. | Political party | Ref | Year (length) |
|---|---|---|---|---|
| Minati Chakraborty | 1 | Communist Party of India (Marxist) | | 2010–2015 |
| Ganga Haldar | 2 | Communist Party of India (Marxist) | | 2010–2015 |
| Dulal Rajak | 3 | Communist Party of India (Marxist) | | 2010–2015 |
| Biswanath Sukul | 4 | Communist Party of India (Marxist) | | 2010–2015 |
| Saibal Agarwala | 5 | Indian National Congress | | 2010–2015 |
| Manira Khatun | 6 | Indian National Congress | | 2010–2015 |
| Gauranga Saha | 7 | Communist Party of India (Marxist) | | 2010–2015 |
| Shyam Mandal | 8 | Revolutionary Socialist Party | | 2010–2015 |
| Kartick Ghosh | 9 | Indian National Congress | | 2010–2015 |
| Rumi | 10 | Revolutionary Socialist Party | | 2010–2015 |
| Sadhan Ghosh | 11 | Indian National Congress | | 2010–2015 |
| Bibhuti Bhushan Ghosh | 12 | Indian National Congress | | 2010–2015 |
| Lipika Ghosh | 13 | Communist Party of India (Marxist) | | 2010–2015 |
| Swadhin Ghosh | 14 | Communist Party of India (Marxist) | | 2010–2015 |
| Santosh Kumar Ghosh | 15 | Communist Party of India (Marxist) | | 2010–2015 |
| Sarmistha Bhattacharjee (Ganguly) | 16 | Communist Party of India (Marxist) | | 2010–2015 |
| Atul Sarkar | 17 | Communist Party of India (Marxist) | | 2010–2015 |
| Bishnupada Sarkar (Dakshin) | 18 | Indian National Congress | | 2010–2015 |
