= Barlow Girls' High School =

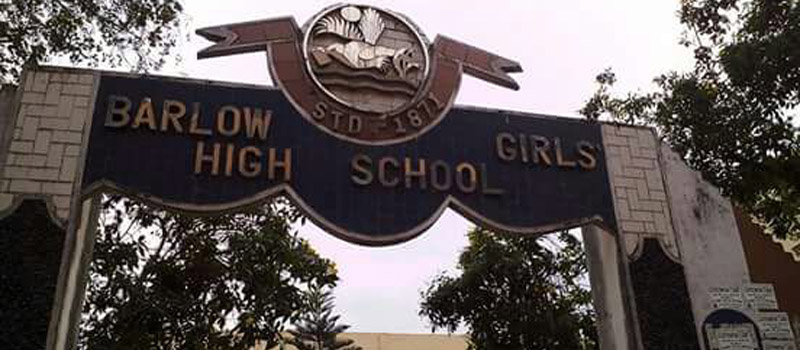
- Main gate of Barlow Girls' High School

Location
- Ramakrishna Mission Rd; Malda, West Bengal; India

Information
- Type: Higher Secondary
- Established: 1871
- School district: Malda
- Headmistress: Dr. Dipasree Majumdar
- Campus: Urban
- Affiliation: WBBSE & WBCHSE
- Website: barlowgirlshs.in

Barlow Girls' High Schoo is a higher secondary school located at Ramakrishna Mission Road, Makdumpur, Malda, Malda, West Bengal, India. It was established in 1871. Notable Indian politician Uma Roy was its notable alumni and later Headmistress.

== Notable alumni ==
- Subhamita Banerjee- Bengali singer from Malda, India, who specializes in modern songs, Ghazals. She has many Bengali albums to her credit and is one of the well known singers in the Bengali music industry.
