= Malda Museum =

- Established: 1937
- Location: English Bazar, West Bengal
- Coordinates: 24.9969°N 88.1440°E
- Type: Archaeological museum

Malda Museum is an archaeological museum under the West Bengal Directorate of Archaeology. The museum was established in 1937 and is situated on Subhankar Bandh Road of English Bazar in Malda district of West Bengal, India.

== Overview ==
The museum took off initially as a collection of historic artifacts found within the district and was set up within the premises of the Malda District Library. It was later shifted to a new adjacent building of its own and granted the status of a museum in its own right under the State Directorate of Archaeology.

Though Malda itself came up only in the times of British colonial rule, the region had been the seat of power of Bengal since the 7th century till the late 16th century, when the nearby Gour and Pandua served as the capital cities of the entire Bengal region. The museum, renovated and revamped recently, showcases the archaeological, anthropological, and historical heritage of the region. The museum has a number of fine specimens of sculptures, figurines, calligraphic inscription tablets, terracotta plaques and other artifacts that represent more than 1500 years of history and heritage.
