= Old Malda =

- City
- Location in West Bengal, India Old Malda (India) Old Malda (Asia)
- Coordinates: 25.04°N 88.14°E
- Country: India
- State: West Bengal
- District: Malda

Government
  - Type: Municipality
  - Body: Old Malda Municipality
  - Chairman: Basistha Trivedi

Population (2011)
  - Total: 84,012

Languages
  - Official: Bengali
  - Additional official: English
- Time zone: UTC+5:30 (IST)
- PIN: 732128, 732142
- Lok Sabha constituency: Maldaha Uttar
- Vidhan Sabha constituency: Maldaha
- Website: malda.nic.in

Old Malda is a town and municipality in Malda district in the Indian state of West Bengal. It is a part of the Malda Metropolitan Area (Urban Agglomeration). It is located on the eastern bank of the river Mahananda.

== Geography ==
Old Malda is located at 25.04°N 88.14°E.

== Demographics ==
As of 2001 India census, Old Malda had a population of 62,944. Males constitute 52% of the population and females 48%. Old Malda has an average literacy rate of 61%, higher than the national average of 59.5%: male literacy is 67%, and female literacy is 54%. In Old Malda, 15% of the population is under 6 years of age. Most of the people are Hindu. Some Muslim, Shikh, Christian people live here.
