= Malda district =

District in West Bengal, India

Malda district Māldôho Jelā (Bengali)
- District of West Bengal
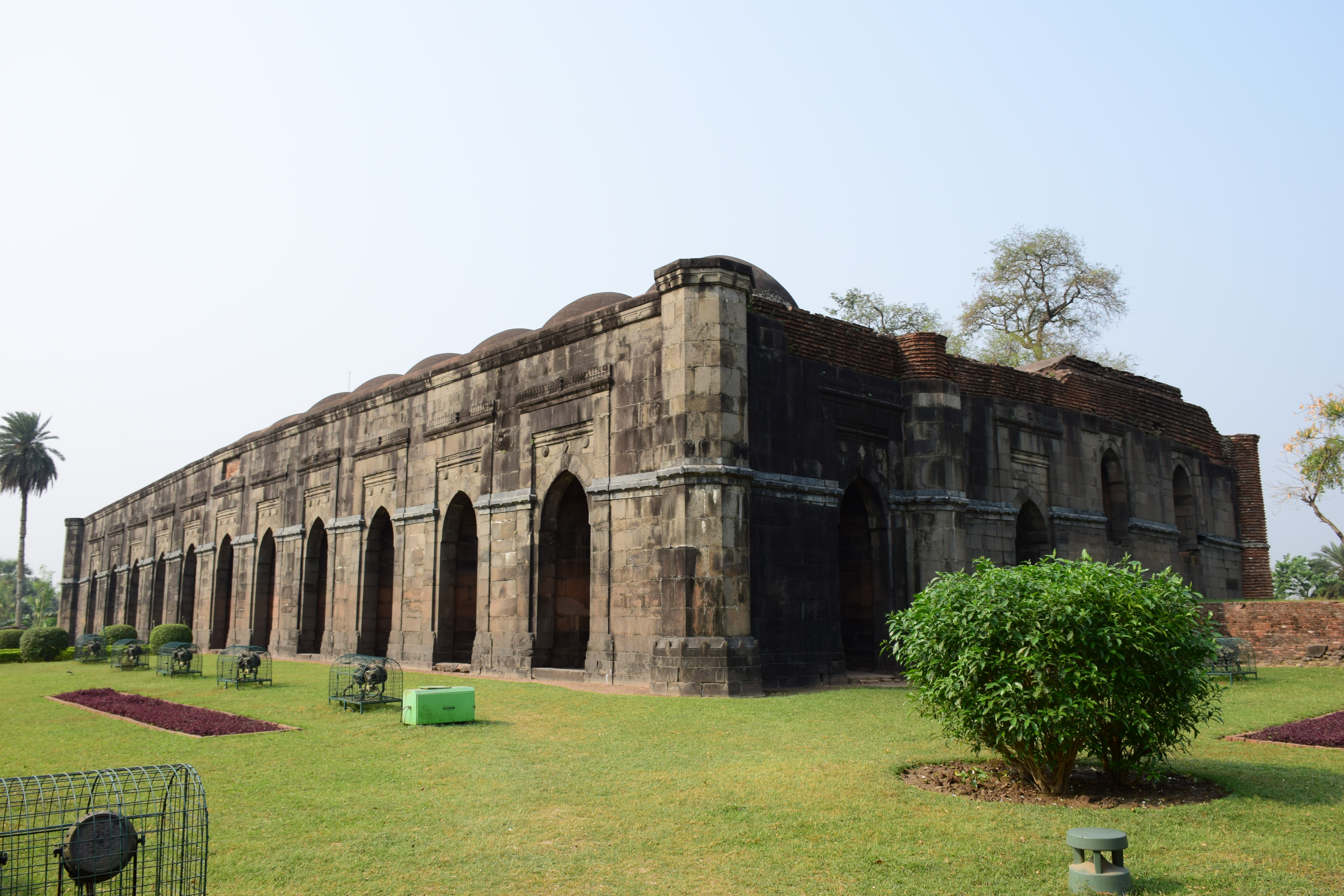
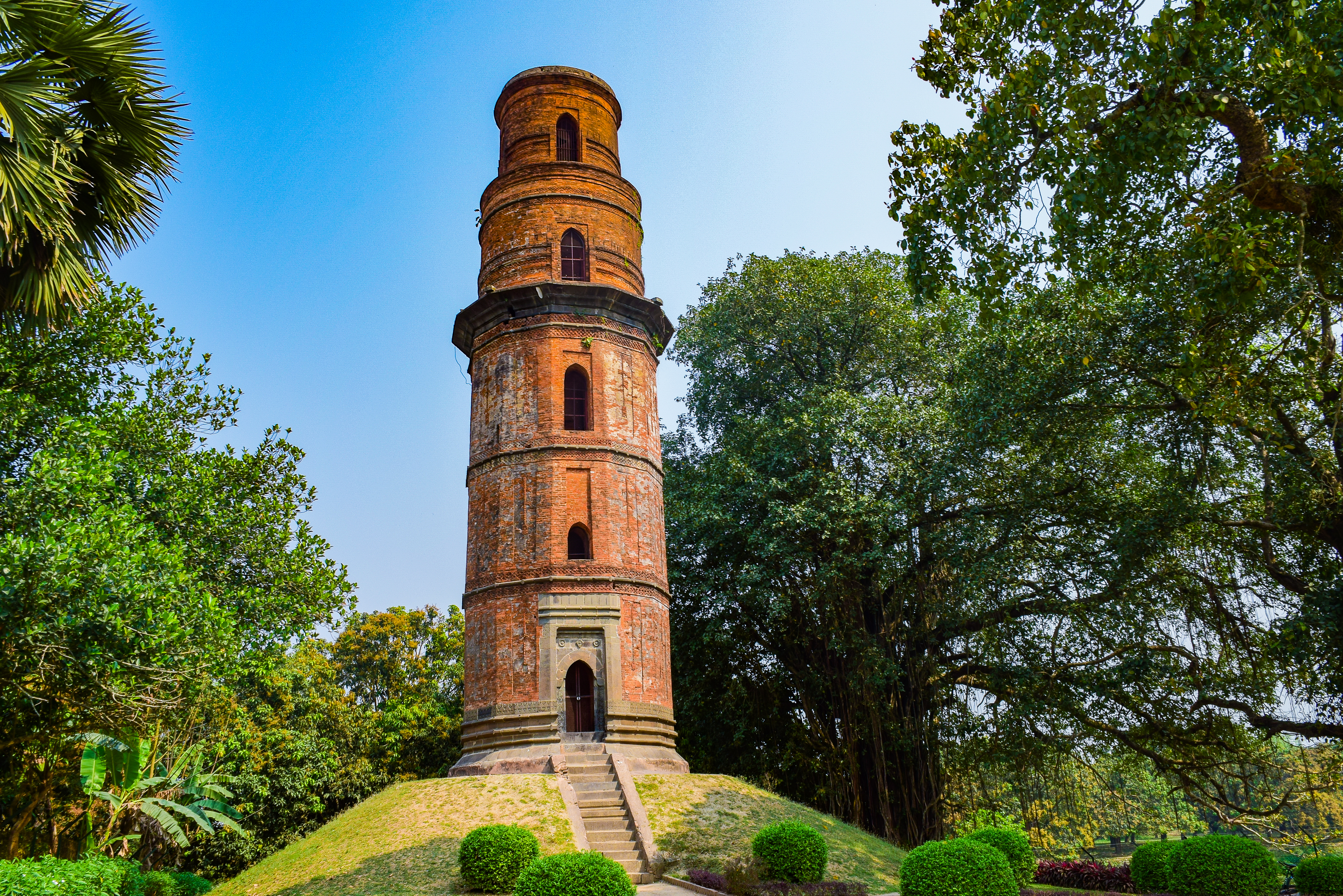
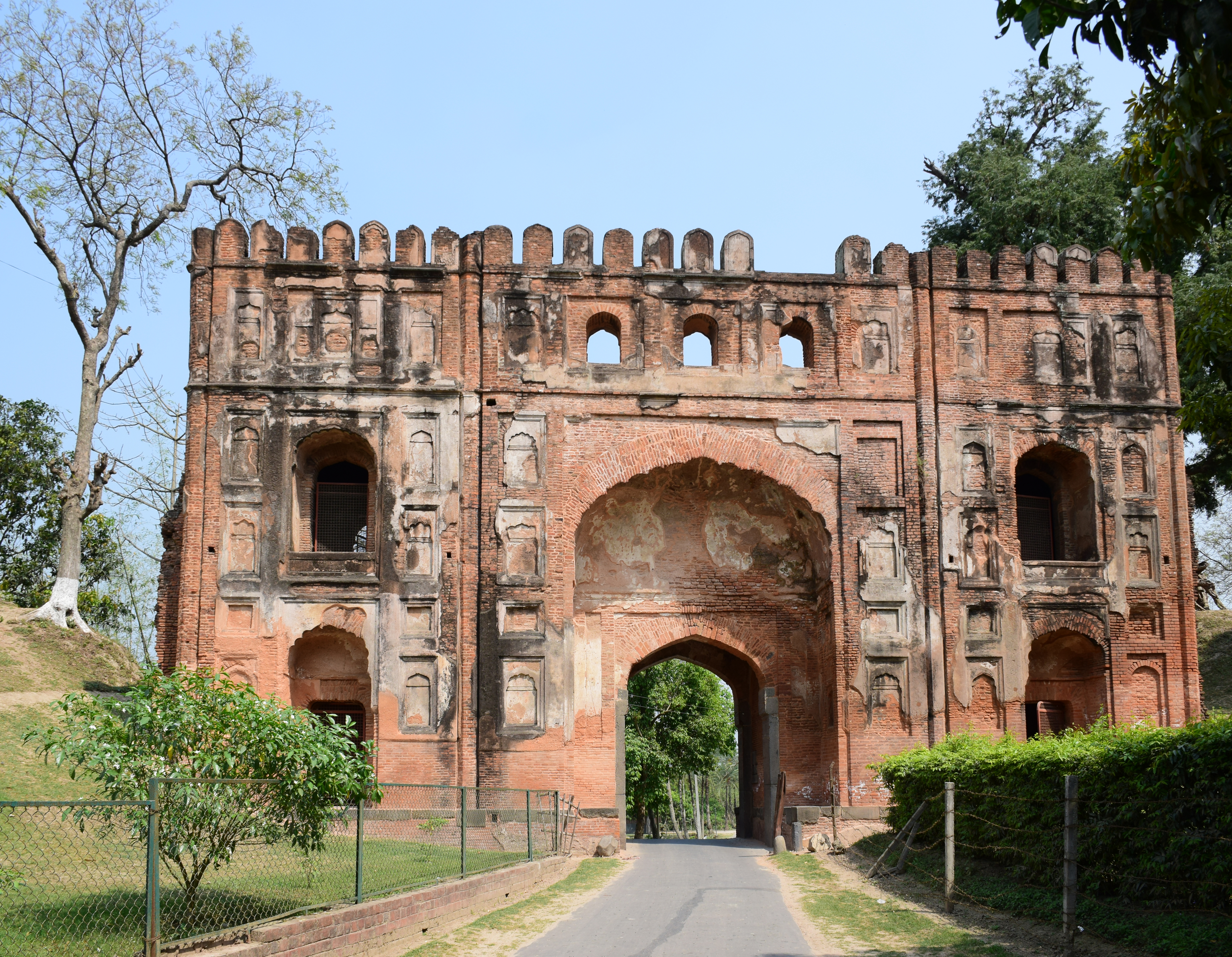
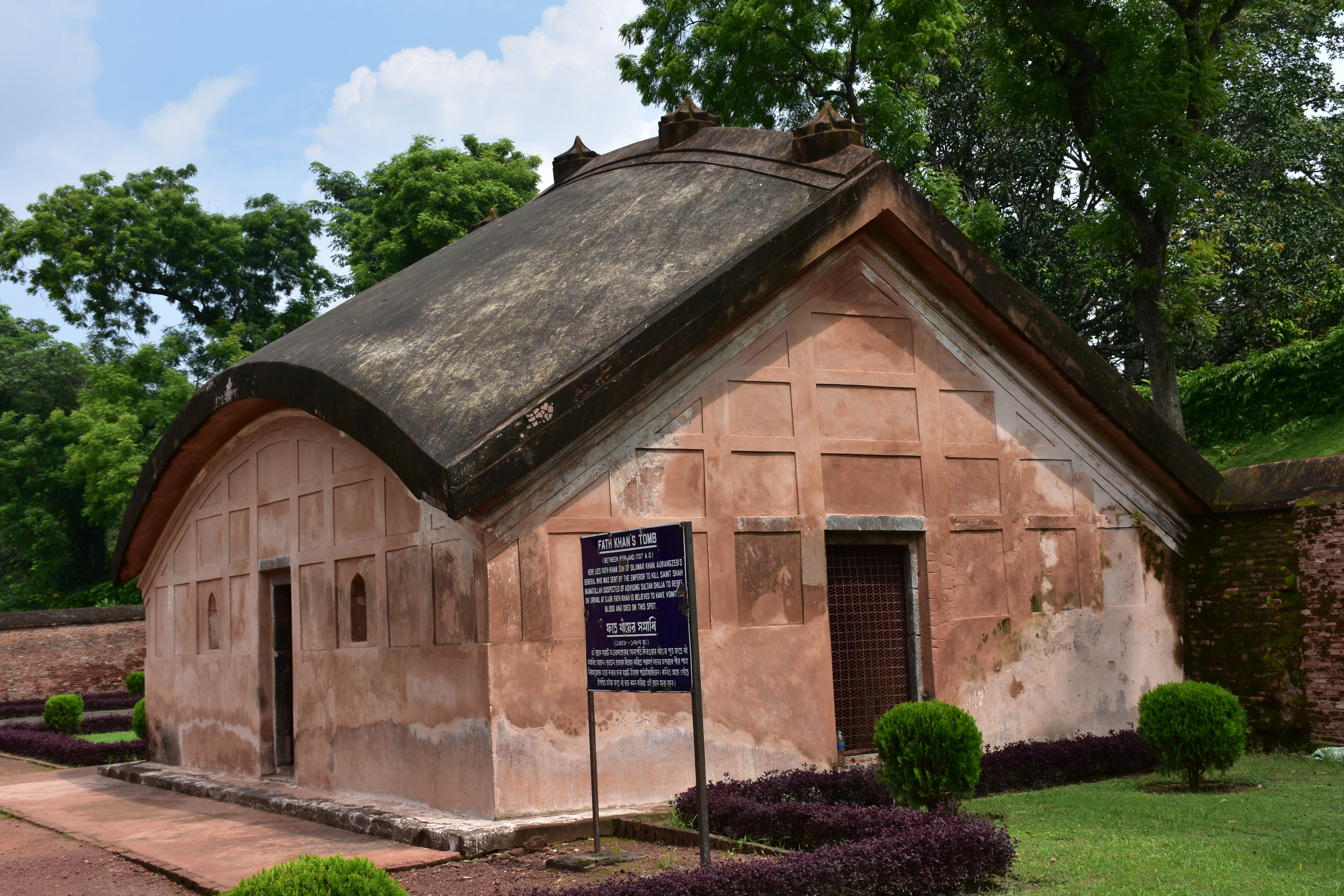
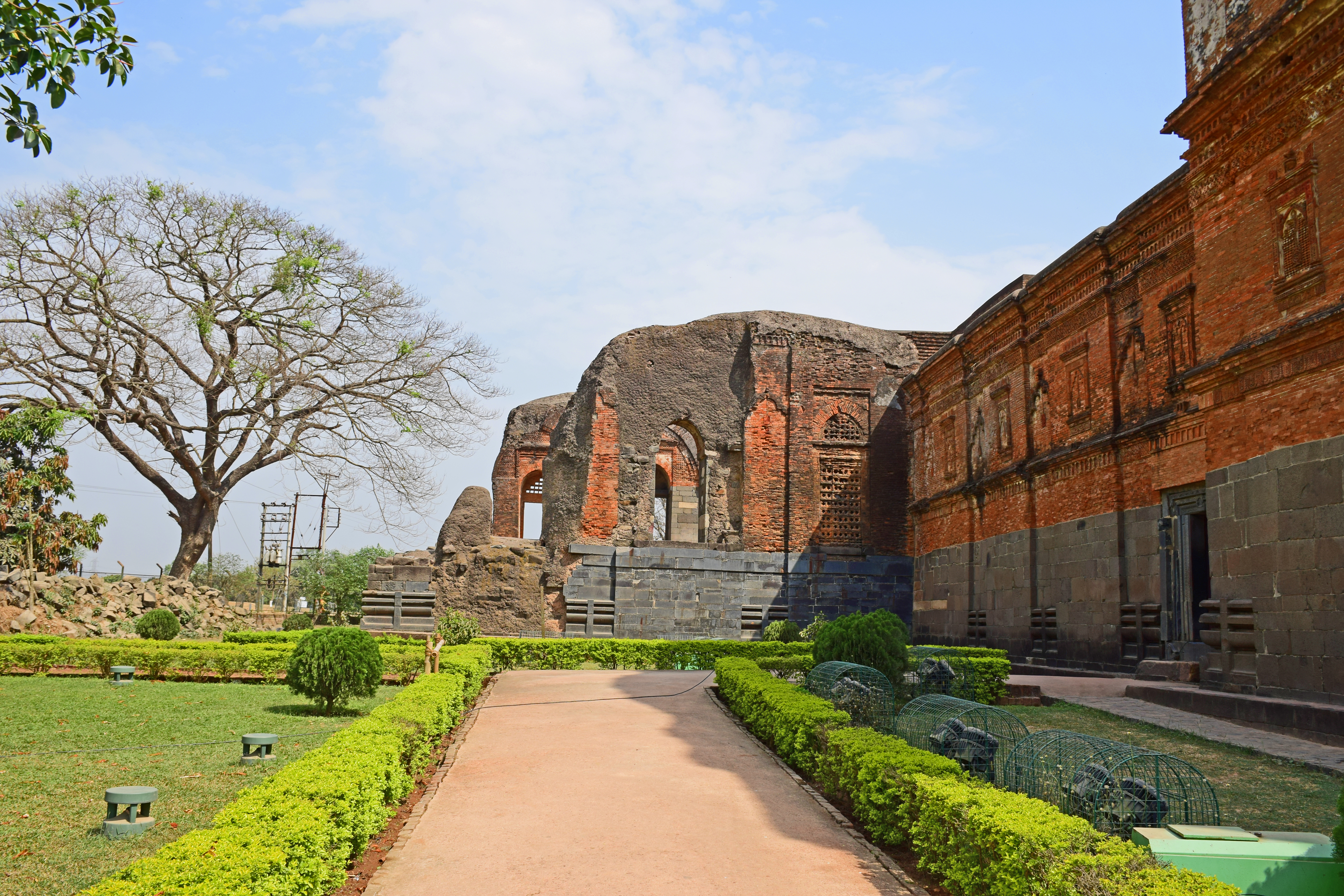
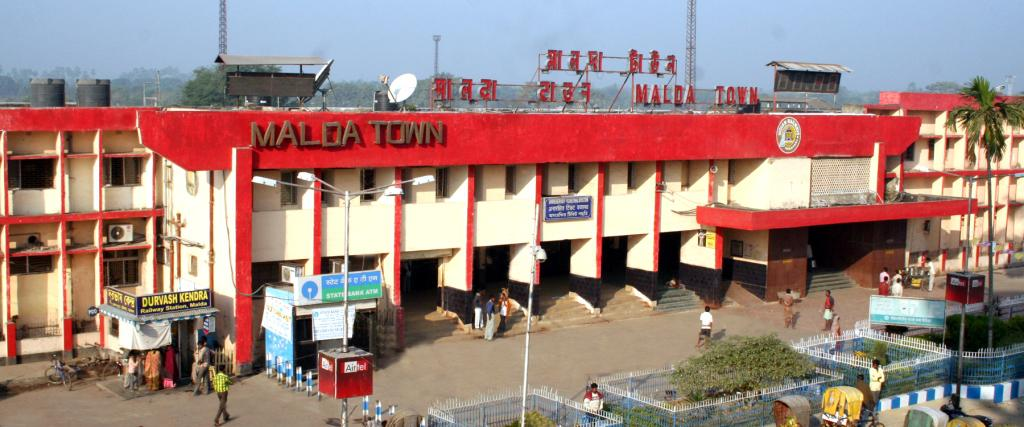
- Clockwise from top-left: Baro Sona mosque, Lukachuri gateway in Gaur, Adina Mosque, Malda Town Railway Station, Tomb of Fateh Khan and Firoz Minar
- Interactive map of Malda district
- Coordinates: 25°06′N 88°06′E
- Country: India
- State: West Bengal
- Division: Malda
- Headquarters: Malda

Government
  - Subdivisions: Malda Sadar, Chanchal
  - CD Blocks: English Bazar, Old Malda, Gazole, Habibpur, Kaliachak I, Kaliachak II, Kaliachak III, Manikchak, Bamangola, Chanchal I, Chanchal II, Ratua I, Ratua II, Harishchandrapur I, Harishchandrapur II
  - Lok Sabha constituencies: Maldah Dakshin, Maldah Uttar
  - Vidhan Sabha constituencies: Habibpur, Gazole, Chanchal, Harishchandrapur, Malatipur, Ratua, Manikchak, Maldah, English Bazar, Mothabari, Sujapur, Baisnabnagar

Area
  - Total: 3,733 km^{2} (1,441 sq mi)

Population (2011)
  - Total: 3,988,845
  - Density: 1,069/km^{2} (2,767/sq mi)
  - Urban: 541,660

Demographics
  - Literacy: 62.71 per cent
  - Sex ratio: 939 ♂/♀

Languages
  - Official: Bengali
  - Additional official: English
- Time zone: UTC+05:30 (IST)
- Website: malda.gov.in

Malda district, also spelt Maldah or Maldaha (Bengali: [malda], [maldɔɦ], often [maldɔɦo]), is a district in West Bengal, India. The capital of the Bengal Sultanate, Gauda and Pandua, was situated in this district. Mango, jute and silk are the most notable products of this district. The special variety of mango, Fazli, produced in this region is popularly known by the name of the district and is exported across the world and is internationally acclaimed. The folk culture of gombhira is a feature of the district, being a unique way of representation of joy and sorrow in daily life of the common people, as well as the unique medium of presentation on national and international matters.

According to the National Investigation Agency, Malda is believed to be a hub of a fake currency racket. It has been reported that 90 per cent of the fake currency that enters India (through Bangladesh) originates in Malda. The headquarters of Malda district is in English Bazar, also known as Malda, which was once the capital of Bengal. The district maintains the traditions of the past in culture and education. Old Malda, the town which lies just east of the confluence of the Mahananda and Kalindi rivers, is part of the English Bazar metropolitan city. The town rose to prominence as the river port of the old capital of Pandua. During the 18th century, it was the seat of prosperous cotton and silk industries. It remains an important distribution centre for rice, jute, and wheat. The area between the historical monument of Jame Masjid (1566) and the landmark of Nimasarai Tower across the river Mahananda, constituted a municipality in 1867. Rice, jute, legumes, and oilseed are the chief crops in the surrounding area. Malda is the largest producer of excellent quality jute in India. Mulberry plantations and mango orchards also occupy large areas; mango trade and silk manufacture are the main economic activities.

== History ==
=== Pre-Gour Era ===
Pāṇini mentioned a city named Gourpura, which by strong reason may be identified as the city of Gouda, ruins of which are situated in this district. Examples are legion of the relics of a predecessor kingdom being used in the monuments of the successor kingdoms.

It had been within the limits of ancient Gour and Pandua (Pundrabardhana). These two cities had been the capital of Bengal in ancient and medieval ages and are equidistant, north and south, from English Bazar town (once known as Engelzavad established by the British rulers). The boundary of Gour was changed in different ages since the fifth century BC, and its name can be found in Puranic texts. Pundranagara was the provincial capital of the Maurya Empire. Gour and Pundravardhana formed parts of the Mourya empire as is evinced from the inscriptions, Brahmi script on a seal discovered from the ruins of Mahasthangarh in the Bogra District of Bangladesh. Xuanzang saw many Ashokan stupas at Pundravardhana.

The inscriptions discovered in the district of undivided Dinajpur and other parts of North Bengal, along with the Allahabad pillar inscriptions of Samudragupta, clearly indicate that the whole of North Bengal as far east as Kamrup formed a part of the Gupta Empire. After the Guptas at the beginning of seventh century AD Sasanka, the king of Karnasubarna, as well as the king of Gauda, ruled independently for more than three decades. From the middle of the eighth century to the end of the 11th century the Pala dynasty ruled Bengal, and the kings were devoted to Buddhism. It was during their reign that the Jagadalla Vihara (monastery) in Barindri flourished paralleling with Nalanda, Vikramshila and Devikot.

=== Gour Era ===
The Pala Empire yielded to the emergence of the Sen Dynasty. The Sen rulers were orthodox Hindus, and in the habit of moving from place to place within their kingdom. During this time, Buddhism went on the defensive. It eventually disappeared from the demographic map of Bengal. At the time of Gaudeshwara Lakshman Sen, Goud was known as Lakshmanabati. During his reign Bengal was attacked by the Turkic force of Bakhtiyar Khilji. After Lakshman Sen, Keshava Sen, Biswarup Sen, Madhava Sen etc. many Sena dynasty rulers ruled Gauda and hold the title Gaudeshwara Then Deva dynasty kings of Chandradwip ruled Bengal. Deva dynasty king Danujmardandeva and Mahendra Deva both hold the title Gaudeshwara.

The name Mal Daha was coined (from Mal meaning riches and Daha meaning lake). Sultans Ilyas Shah, Firuz Shah, Sikandar Shah, Raja Ganesha, Alauddin Hussain Shah and Nasiruddin Nasrat Shah were the notable rulers of the medieval age. Afghan warrior Sher Shah Suri conquered Gour and was repelled by Mughal emperor Humayun. Humayun, loving the mango of Gour, named the place Jannatabad (garden of heaven). Firuz Shah Tughlaq, Ghiyasuddin and the Mughal army invaded Gour to suppress rebellion several times.

Relics of Islamic architecture structures are present in Malda district, such as Firuz minar, Adina Mosque (the largest mosque of South Asia at the time), and Qutwali Gate. During the Mughal rule, the capital was removed to Dhaka due to a course change of the river Ganges. Muslim rule ended in 1757. Koch army invasion increased during the downfall of Gour.

=== Post-Gour Era ===
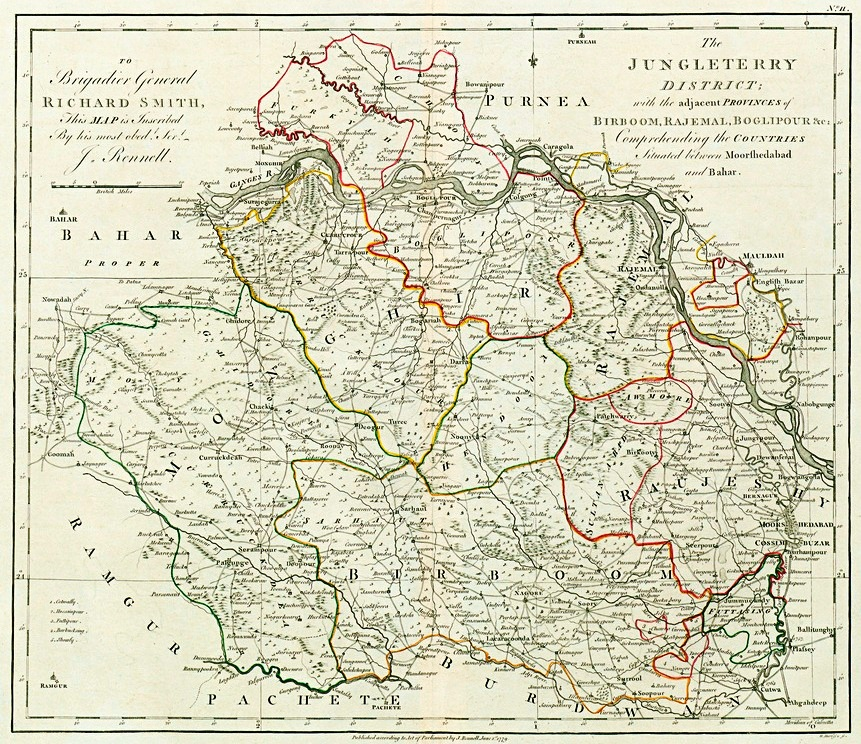
1779 map of the Jungle Terry District.

After the war of Palassy, the British rule started in 1757. The English traders settled in the southern bank of the river Mahananda. Some indigo plant chambers, trade centre, and offices were established. William Carey worked here. But the glory days were gone.

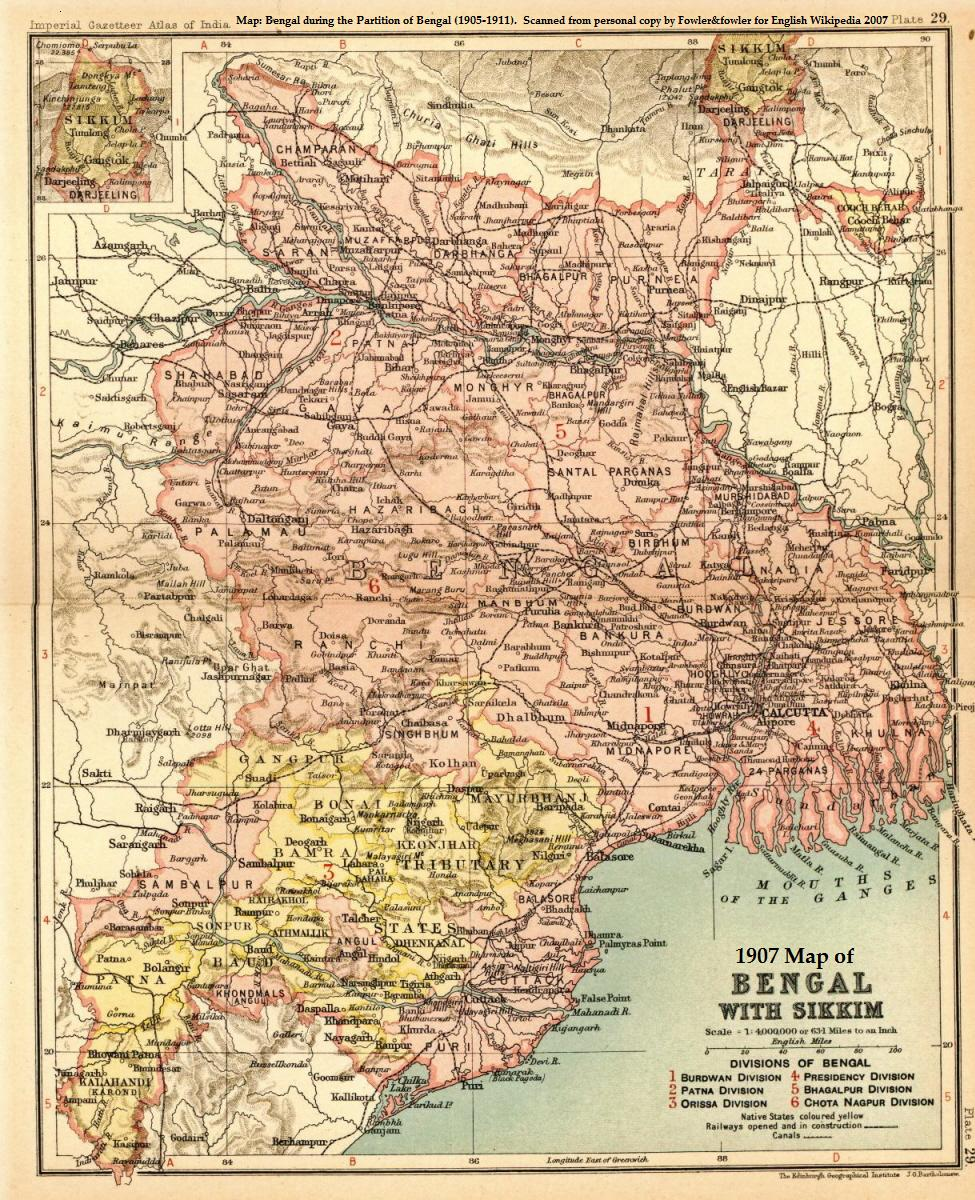
1907 Map of Bengal with Sikkim

This district was formed out of some portions of outlying areas of Purnia, Dinajpur and Rajshahi districts in 1813. At the time of Dr. B. Hamilton (1808–09), the present thanas of Gazole, Malda, Bamongola, and part of Habibpur were included in the district of Dinajpur and the thanas of Harischandrapur, Kharba, Ratua, Manikchak, and Kaliachak were included in the district of Purnia. In 1813, in consequence of the prevalence of serious crimes in the Kaliachak and Sahebganj thanas and also on the rivers, a Joint Magistrate and Deputy Collector were appointed at English Bazar, with jurisdiction over a number of police stations centering that place and taken from the two districts. Thus the district of Malda was born. The year 1832 saw the establishment of a separate treasury and the year 1859 the posting of a full-fledged magistrate and collector.

Up to 1876, this district formed part of Rajshahi Division and between 1876 and 1905, it formed part of Bhagalpur Division. In 1905, it was again transferred to Rajshahi Division and until 1947, Malda remained in this division. During the first Partition of Bengal of 1905, this district was attached to the newly created province of Eastern Bengal and Assam. Malda has a history of the Indigo movement led by Rafique Mondal. The Santhals got insurgent and captured historic Adina Mosque in support of Jeetu. Again in August 1947, this district was affected by partition. Between 12–15 August 1947, the fate of the district as to which side it should go, to Pakistan or to India, was undecided because the announcement of the partition award of Cyril Radcliffe did not make this point clear. During these few days, the district was under a Magistrate of East Pakistan due to Muslim majority (1941 British India census). When the details of the Radcliffe Award were published, the district came over to West Bengal on 17 August 1947. However, the sub-division of Nawabganj was severed from Malda and was given to East Pakistan as a sub-division of the Rajshahi district.

== Geography ==
The latitude range is 24°40’20" N to 25°32’08" N, and the longitude range is 87°45’50" E to 88°28’10" E. The district covers an area of 3,733.66 square kilometres (1,441.6 sq mi). The total population (as of 2001 Census) was recorded as 3,290,160.

Malda is called the gateway of North Bengal. It was once the capital of Gour-Banga with its 3,733 square kilometres (1,441 sq mi) lay of the land classified into Tal, Diara, and Barind.

To the south is Murshidabad district, to the north are North Dinajpur district and South Dinajpur district. To the east is the international border with Bangladesh. To the west is Santhal Parganas of Jharkhand and Purnea of Bihar.

=== Malda City ===
Malda, the district headquarters which lends its name to the district, during its early days grew up only near the side of the river Mahananda, and now the place is known as Phulbari. Some of the oldest houses can be found here. The city started to grow from 1925 to 1930. Now nearly a half-million people live in this city, and it is one of the biggest cities of West Bengal. It was a part of the historic city of Gour. Malda is recognised as the Old Malda municipality and the English Bazar municipality. Its notable railway station is named as Malda Town.

=== Mahadipur international border crossing ===
The Mahadipur international border crossing is on the Malda-Rajshahi route at Mahadipur town in Malda district.

== Local newspapers ==
The first monthly periodicals published from Malda was Kusum, edited by Radhesh Chandra Seth, a noted personality of the then Malda. Though the exact date of its first publications is not known, it has been assumed by the informed sources that Kusum was first published in the 1890s. In 1896, Radhesh Chandra published two weekly newspapers Gourdoot and Gourbarta. In 1897 Maldaha Samachar edited by Kaliprasanna Chakrabarty began to be published. Maulavi Abdul Ganikhan published 'Malda Akhbar' in 1914. In the same year, another periodical Gambhira' edited by Krishna Charan Sarkar was published. Damru, Adina and Minar—three weekly newspapers were published in 1941. The editors were Nanda Gopal Chowdhury, Akbar Munshi and Abdur Rahaman respectively.

The most important among them was Gourdoot which was first published on 1896 by Radhesh Chandra Seth. But within a short period, the publication of the newspaper came to an end as the editor faced a serious financial loss. The 'Gourdoot' again began to be published from 1912 under the editorship of Lalbihari Majumdar. Majumdar was a great scholar and his literary sense was appreciated by Benoy Kumar Sarkar and Radhesh Chandra Seth. In this endeavour, the editor was greatly supported by them and financed by Sarat Chandra Roy Chowdhury, Maharaja of Chancal. The Gourdoot was used to be published on Thursday of each week. The paper contained 6 pages and the price is one anna in 1944. The political outlook of the newspaper is pro-Congress. Moreover, Lalbihari Majumdar, its editor, took a pioneering role in organising the congress movement in Malda.

== Popular movements in Malda ==
The most important among the popular movement is the one led by Jitu Santhal in 1932. Historians like Tanika Sarkar observes Jitu's movement was rooted in the rich tradition of tribal struggle in Malda. The early form of Santhal resistance was migration, which Professor Ashim Sarkar thinks amounted to a kind of passive resistance. Active struggle between the Santhals and their landlords began about 1910.

As the barind (barindra) area began to be transformed into a developed agricultural zone, the zamindars of barind began to enhance the rent and curb the rights so far enjoyed by the Santhal from 1910 onwards. M.O Carter mentions cases were commonly found in which the lands cultivated by the adhiars, which were previously their occupancy holdings but had been sold up in rent or mortgage sales. This caused friction among zamindars and Santhals. The friction took an alarming proportion as early as 1910 when a zamindar of Bulbulchandi tried to enhance the rent. The Santhal tenants rose into protest. The gravity of the situation compelled Mr. Vas, the District Magistrate, to interfere and fix the rent. It was in this backdrop of oppression, exploitation and injustice. Jitu Santhal of Kochakandahar village of Habibpur began to mobilise the Santhals for a widespread movement. In 1926 Jitu became the leader of the Santhals by converting them to Manuvadi Hinduism. In the same year 'Jitu's Sanyasi Dal' defied police order to perform a Kali puja to assert its new Hindu status. In September 1928 Santhals under Jitu's leadership looted the autumn crop of Sikharpur which had recently been taken away from them in barind region. The District Magistrate and the Superintendent of the Police rushed to the spot with armed police. After much skirmishes, Jitu along with his sixty followers arrested at the hand of the police.

== Economy ==
In 2006 the Ministry of Panchayati Raj named Malda one of the country's 283 most backward districts (out of a total of 640). It is one of the eleven districts in West Bengal currently receiving funds from the Backward Regions Grant Fund Programme (BRGF). No notable industry is made here. Most of the people of the district are agricultural labourer and unskilled labourer.

== Divisions ==
=== Administrative subdivisions ===
The district comprises two subdivisions: Chanchal and Malda Sadar. Chanchal consists of six community development blocks: Chanchal–I, Chanchal–II, Ratua–I, Ratua–II, Harishchandrapur–I and Harishchandrapur–II. Malda Sadar subdivision consists of Old Malda municipality, English Bazar municipality and nine community development blocks: English Bazar, Gazole, Habibpur, Kaliachak–I, Kaliachak–II, Kaliachak–III, Manickchak, Old Malda and Bamangola. English Bazar is the district headquarters. There are 15 police stations(including malda woman police station), and one cybersecurity police station 15 development blocks, 2 municipalities, 146 gram panchayats and 3,701 villages in this district.

Other than municipality areas, each subdivision contains community development blocs, which in turn, are divided into rural areas and census towns. In total there are 10 urban units, 2 municipalities and 3 census towns. English Bazar and Old Malda form an urban agglomeration.

==== Chanchal subdivision ====
- Chanchal I (community development block) consists of rural areas (8 gram panchayats) and town Chanchal,(second largest town in Malda).
- Chanchal II (community development block) consists of rural areas only (7 gram panchayats).
- Ratua I (community development block) consists of rural areas only (10 gram panchayats).
- Ratua II (community development block) consists of rural areas only (8 gram panchayats).
- Harishchandrapur I (community development block) consists of rural areas only (7 gram panchayats).
- Harishchandrapur II (community development block) consists of rural areas only (9 gram panchayats).

==== Malda Sadar subdivision ====
- English Bazar: municipality
- Old Malda: municipality
- English Bazar (community development block) consists of rural areas only (11 gram panchayats).
- Gazole (community development block) consists of rural areas only (15 gram panchayats).
- Habibpur (community development block) consists of rural areas (11 gram panchayats) and three census towns: Kachu Pukur, Kendua and Aiho.
- Kaliachak I (community development block) consists of rural areas only (14 gram panchayats).
- Kaliachak II (community development block) consists of rural areas only (9 gram panchayats).
- Kaliachak III (community development block) consists of rural areas only (14 gram panchayats).
- Manikchak (community development block) consists of rural areas only (11 gram panchayats).
- Old Malda (community development block) consists of rural areas only (6 gram panchayats).
- Bamangola (community development block) consists of rural areas only (6 gram panchayats).

=== Assembly Constituencies ===
No.	Name	Lok Sabha	MLA	2026 Winner	2024 Lead
43	Habibpur (ST)	Maldaha Uttar	Joyel Murmu	Bharatiya Janata Party	Bharatiya Janata Party
44	Gazole (SC)	Maldaha Uttar	Chinmoy Deb Barman	Bharatiya Janata Party	Bharatiya Janata Party
45	Chanchal	Maldaha Uttar	Prasun Banerjee	Trinamool Congress	Indian National Congress
46	Harishchandrapur	Maldaha Uttar	Mohammad Matibur Rahaman	Trinamool Congress	Indian National Congress
47	Malatipur	Maldaha Uttar	Abdur Rahim Boxi	Trinamool Congress	Indian National Congress
48	Ratua	Maldaha Uttar	Samar Mukherjee	Trinamool Congress	Indian National Congress
49	Manikchak	Maldaha Dakshin	Gour Chandra Mandal	Bharatiya Janata Party	Bharatiya Janata Party
50	Maldaha (SC)	Maldaha Uttar	Gopal Chandra Saha	Bharatiya Janata Party	Bharatiya Janata Party
51	English Bazar	Maldaha Dakshin	Amlan Bhaduri	Bharatiya Janata Party	Bharatiya Janata Party
52	Mothabari	Maldaha Dakshin	Mohammad Najrul Islam	Trinamool Congress	Indian National Congress
53	Sujapur	Maldaha Dakshin	Sabina Yeasmin	Trinamool Congress	Indian National Congress
54	Baisnabnagar	Maldaha Dakshin	Raju Karmakar	Bharatiya Janata Party	Bharatiya Janata Party

=== Villages ===
- Chitholia

== Demographics ==
Historical population
Year	Pop.	±% p.a.
1901	603,649	—
1911	698,547	+1.47%
1921	686,174	−0.18%
1931	720,440	+0.49%
1941	844,315	+1.60%
1951	937,580	+1.05%
1961	1,221,923	+2.68%
1971	1,612,657	+2.81%
1981	2,031,871	+2.34%
1991	2,637,032	+2.64%
2001	3,290,468	+2.24%
2011	3,988,845	+1.94%

Bengalis about 91% including Bengali Muslims and Bengali Hindus form the majority of the district population. Bengali Muslims about 51.27% form the majority of Malda district population whereas Bengali Hindus are the second largest community forming about 48% of District population. According to the 2011 census Malda district has a population of 3,988,845, roughly equal to the nation of Liberia or the US state of Oregon. This gives it a ranking of 58th in India (out of a total of 640). The district has a population density of 1,071 inhabitants per square kilometre (2,770/sq mi) . Its population growth rate over the decade 2001-2011 was 21.5%. Malda has a sex ratio of 939 females for every 1000 males, and a literacy rate of 62.71%. 13.58% of the population live in urban areas. Scheduled Castes and Scheduled Tribes make up 20.94% and 7.87% of the population respectively.

Community

Malda has a largely diverse range of population groups. People from adjoining regions like Bihar and Murshidabad district came here since centuries. People of various classes and tribes like Polia, Shershabadia, Khotta, Panjhra, Chain Mondal, Rajbanshi, and Santhal inhabit the district.

=== Religion ===
Religion in Malda district (2011 census)
1. Islam (51.3%)
2. Hinduism (48.0%)
3. Christianity (0.33%)
4. No religion (0.16%)
5. Sikhism (0.02%)
6. Jainism (0.02%)
7. Buddhism (0.01%)
8. Other religions (0.20%)

Religion in present-day Malda district
Religion	Population (1941)	Percentage (1941)	Population (1951)	Percentage (1951)	Population (2011)	Percentage (2011)
Islam	414,031	49.04%	346,649	36.97%	2,045,151	51.27%
Hinduism	378,341	44.81%	589,896	62.92%	1,914,352	47.99%
Tribal religion	51,462	6.10%	87	0.01%	7,929	0.20%
Others (Note: Including Jainism, Christianity, Buddhism, Zoroastrianism, Judaism, Ad-Dharmis, or not stated)	481	0.06%			21,413	0.54%
Total Population	844,315	100%	937,580	100%	3,988,845	100%

Muslims are the majority in the district, and are most dominant in the northwest and south along the Padma River. Hindus are in majority to the east of the Padma along the Bangladesh border, as well as in urban areas.

Before independence the district had a Muslim plurality, but due to partition migration, even though uneven in nature in Bengal, decadal Hindu population grew by 56% against the decrease of Muslim population by only 16%, resulting overall Hindu majority at 63%. Since then the percentage of Hindu population has fallen to being minority at 48% in 2011, with a decrease of 15% which more than double of overall West Bengal. Due to lack of sufficient and proper border fencing and security across Bangladesh border, large number of illegal Bangladeshi Muslim immigrants have arrived according to government estimate, political suspects and various research studies.

Population by religion in CD blocks
CD Block	Muslim	Hindu	Other
Harishchandrapur I	59.41%	40.31%	0.28%
Harishchandrapur II	73.65%	26.18%	0.17%
Chanchal I	71.22%	28.61%	0.17%
Chanchal II	71.25%	27.82%	0.93%
Ratua I	66.88%	32.97%	0.15%
Ratua II	78.71%	21.18%	0.11%
Gazole	23.60%	74.51%	1.89%
Bamangola	8.87%	89.96%	1.17%
Habibpur	1.28%	94.96%	3.76%
Old Malda	28.60%	70.00%	1.40%
English Bazar	51.49%	48.34%	0.17%
Manikchak	43.88%	55.96%	0.16%
Kaliachak I	89.29%	10.56%	0.15%
Kaliachak II	65.98%	33.88%	0.14%
Kaliachak III	48.72%	51.01%	0.27%
Area not under any Sub-district	11.66%	86.80%	1.54%

=== Language ===
Languages of Malda District (2011).
1. Bengali (91.0%)
2. Santali (4.18%)
3. Khortha (2.27%)
4. Hindi (1.06%)
5. Other (1.45%)

The language spoken by the populace of Malda district is predominantly Bengali. Khotta, Santali, Maithili and Hindi languages are also spoken by some minority population throughout the district.

== Culture ==
Malda has special cultural sorts like Gombhira, Alkap, Kavigan etc.

=== Festivals ===
Almost all major religious festivals are celebrated, including:

Hindu festivals

- Durga Puja
- Kali Puja
- Diwali
- Dussehra
- Ratha Yatra
- Maha Shivratri

Islamic festivals

- Eid al-Fitr
- Eid al-Adha
- Muharram
- Milad un-Nabi
- Shab-e-Barat
- Shab-e-Qadar

Other religious festivals

- Guru Nanak Jayanti
- Christmas

=== Fairs ===
Some of the most reputed cultural fairs of the district are

- Ramkeli Fair, Gour
- Aiho and Bulbulchandi ' Kali Puja Fair
- Debipur Haribasar 32 Prahar Mela.
- Gobarjanna Kalipujo MelM
- Charak Fair
- Chobbish (24) Prahor at Shingabad and Rishipur
- Dariapur Urush at Dariapur, Kaliachak
- Gazole Utsab
- Kahala Urush at Mothabari
- Kahala Durga Puja Fair .
- Kartik puja Fair
- Moyna Bishohari Mela.
- Eid Fair, Pirana Pir Dargah
- Muharram Fair, at Sattari
- Maha Shivratri Fair or Bhole Bam at Amrity
- Christmas Carnival, Englishbazar, Malda
- 32 praxhar harinam sankirtan at Debipur (Ratua 1, Malda)

== Tourist attractions ==
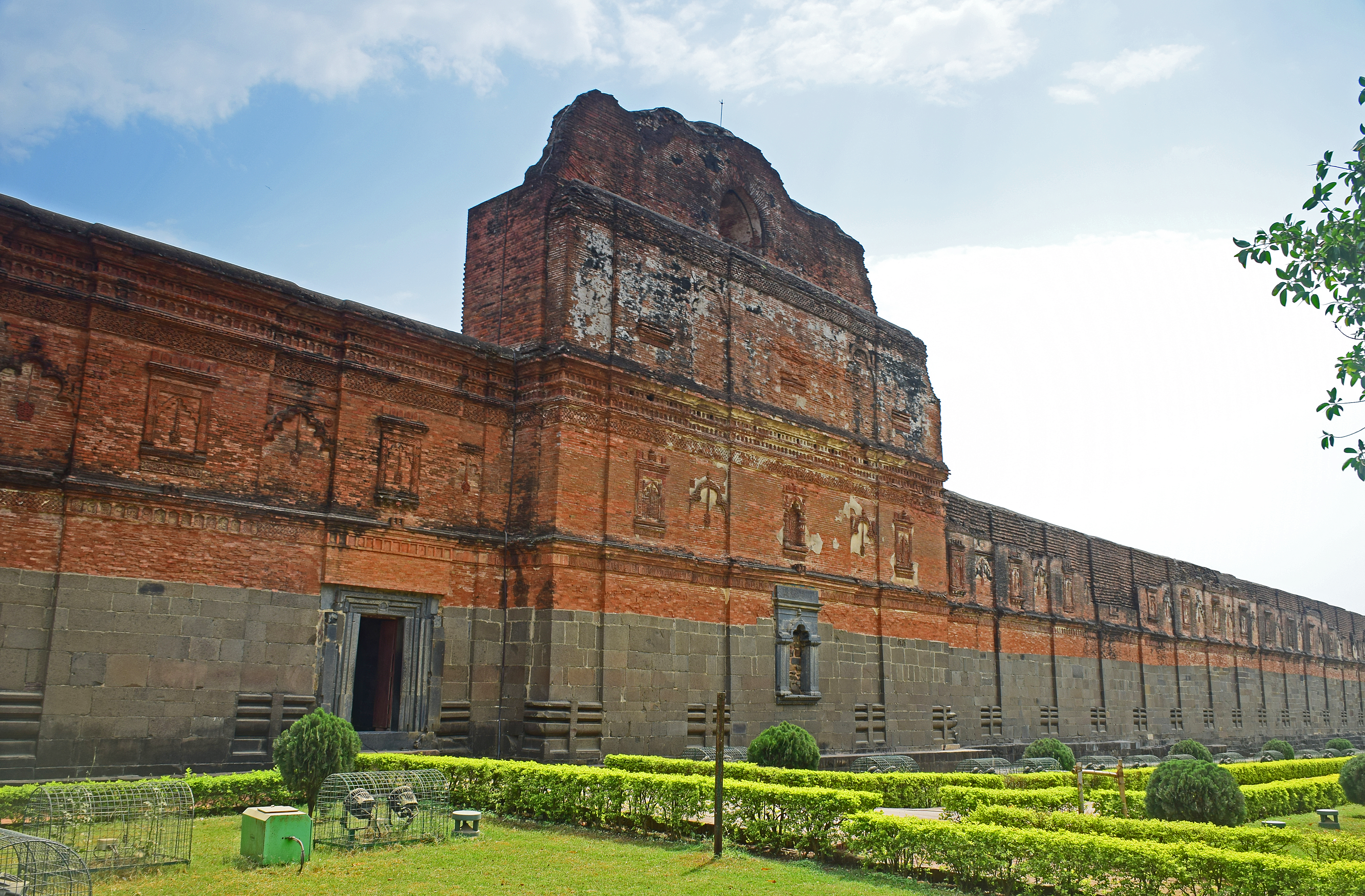
Exterior façade of the Adina Mosque

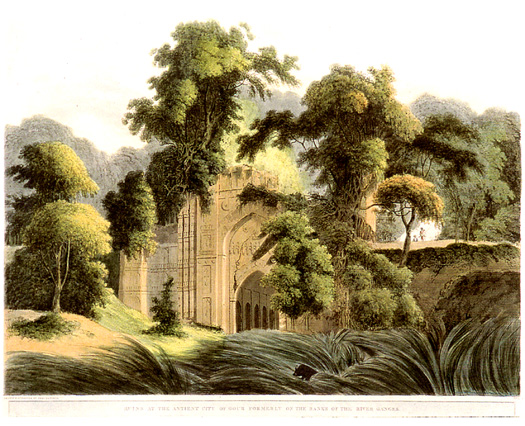
Early 19th century lithograph of the Muslim ruins of Dakhil Darwaza at Gour

The area has a museum, Malda Museum.

- Adina Relics
1. Adina Mosque
2. Gol ghar
3. Eklakhi Mausoleum
4. Adina deer park
- Relics of Gour
1. Firoz minar
2. Chika Masjid
3. Kotwali Gate
4. 12-gated mosque
5. Qadam Rasul Mosque, dargah shrine believed to contain the footprint of the Prophet
- Jami Masjid
- Aquatic Bengal
- Nimai Sarai Tower
- Pandua Sharif
- Pirana Pir Dargah.
- Sattari Jame Mosque
- Lost monastery of Jagjivanpur
- Temple of Ramakrishna Mission
- Temple of Jahura Kali (Local avatar of Goddess Chandi)
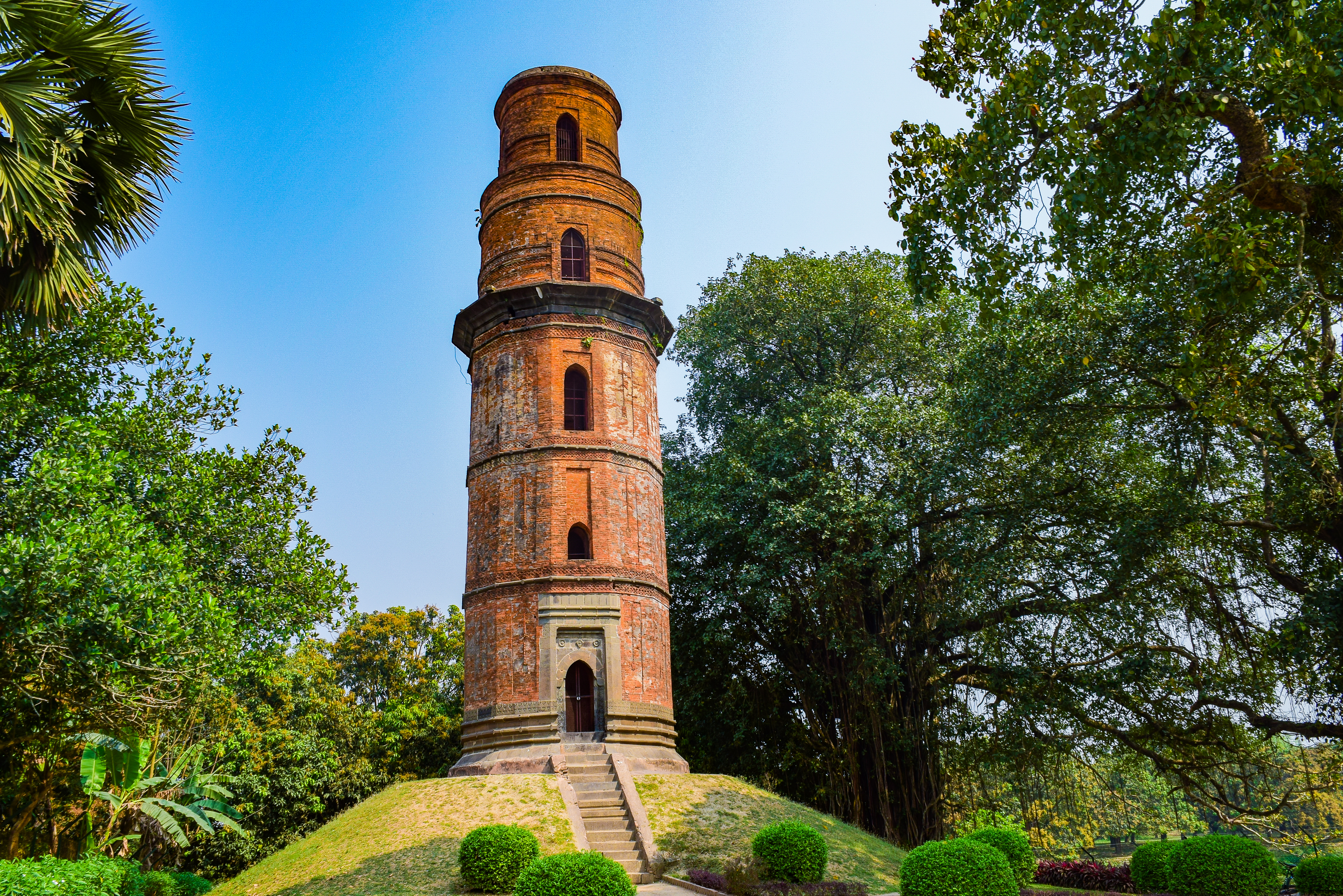
  Firoz Minar was built by Sultan Saifuddin Firuz Shah.It was constructed in the Tughlaqi style of architecture.
- Chanchal Rajbari
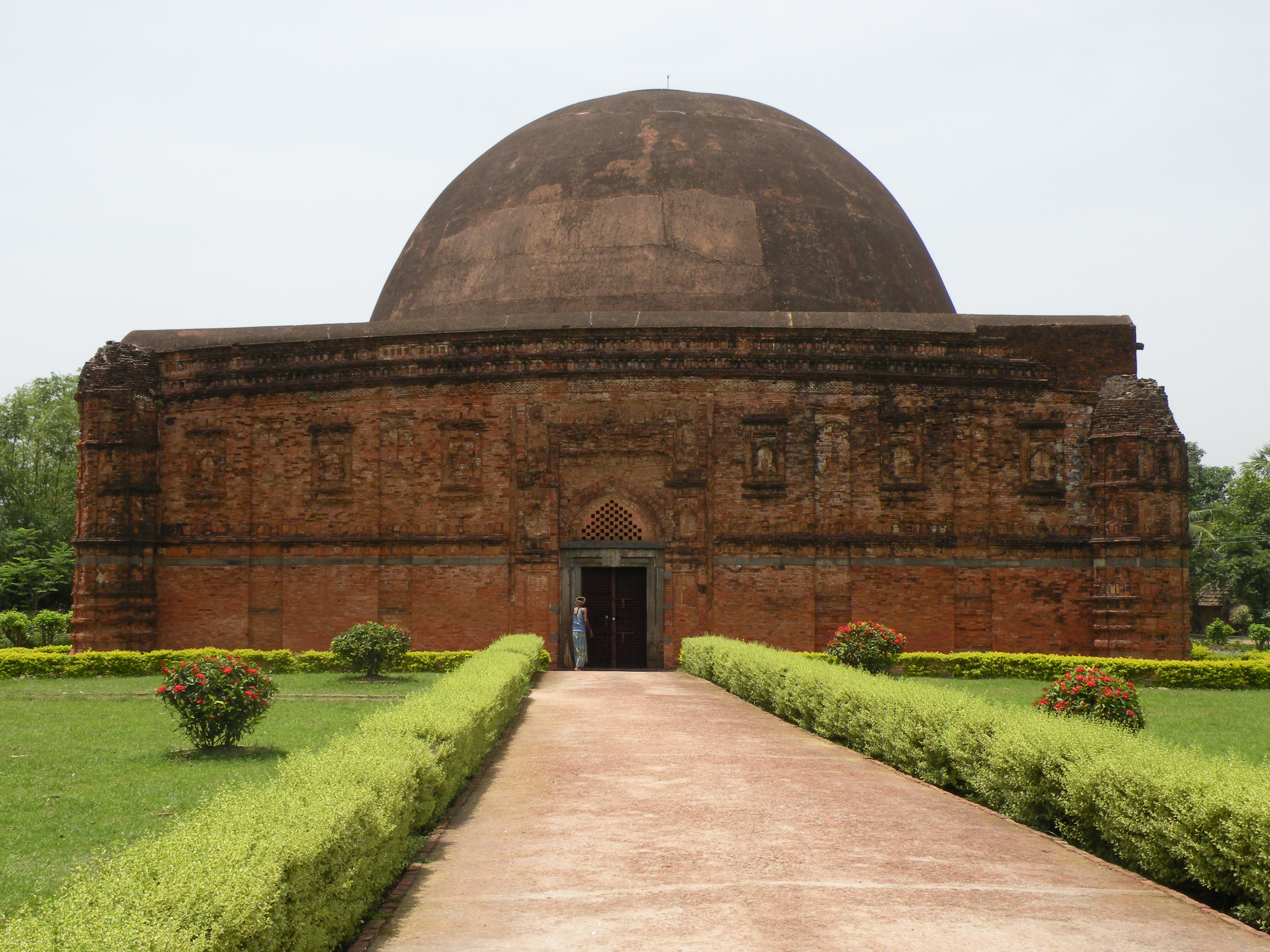
  Eklakhi Mausoleum is a 15th-century mausoleum in Pandua, Malda district, believed to house the tomb of Jalaluddin Muhammad Shah.
- Debipur Haribasar Radhagobinda Temple (Debipur, Ratua 1, Malda)
- Amrity Shiv Mandir
- Gobarjanna Kali Mandir

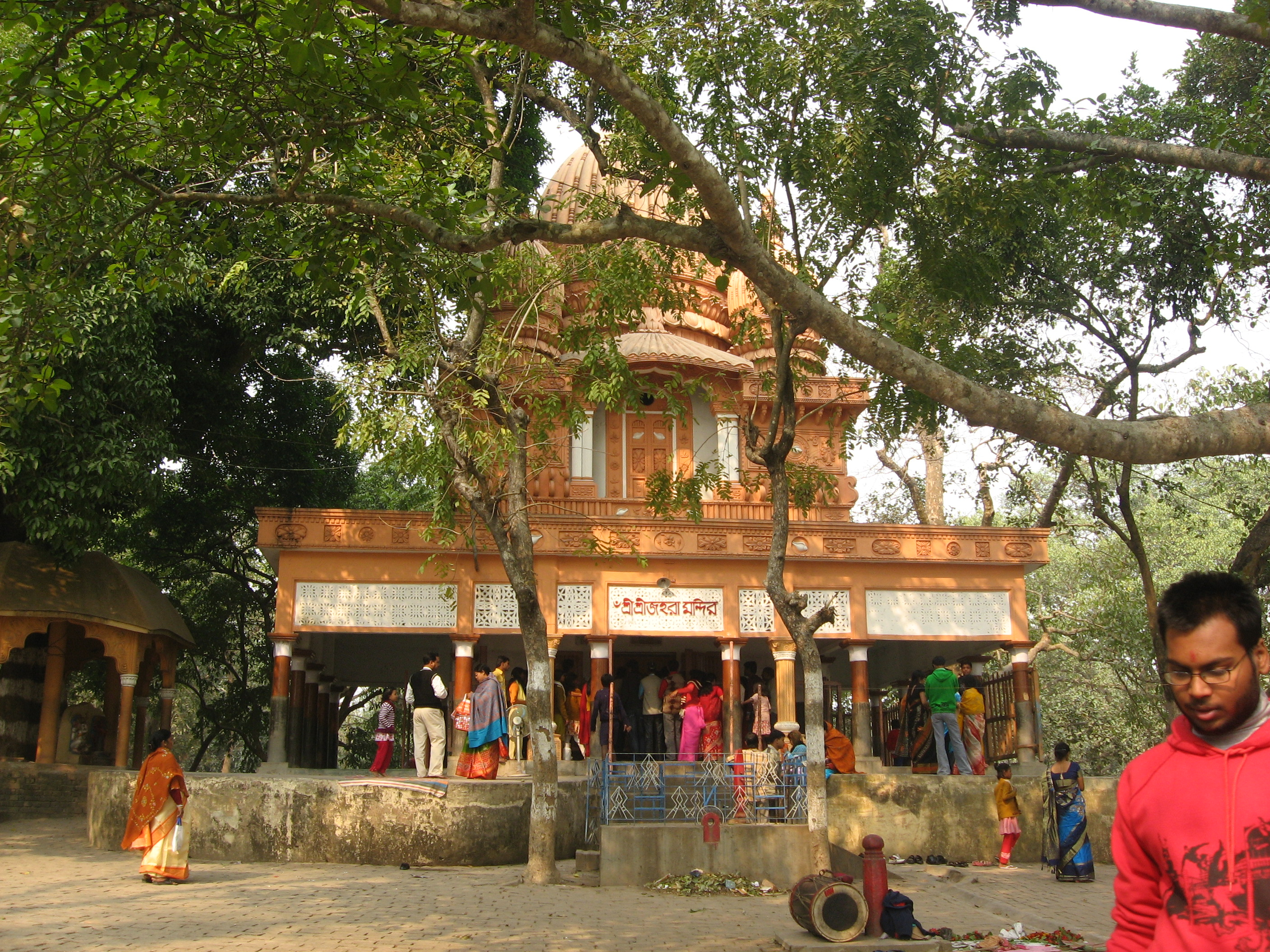
Temple of Jahura Kali Bari, Malda

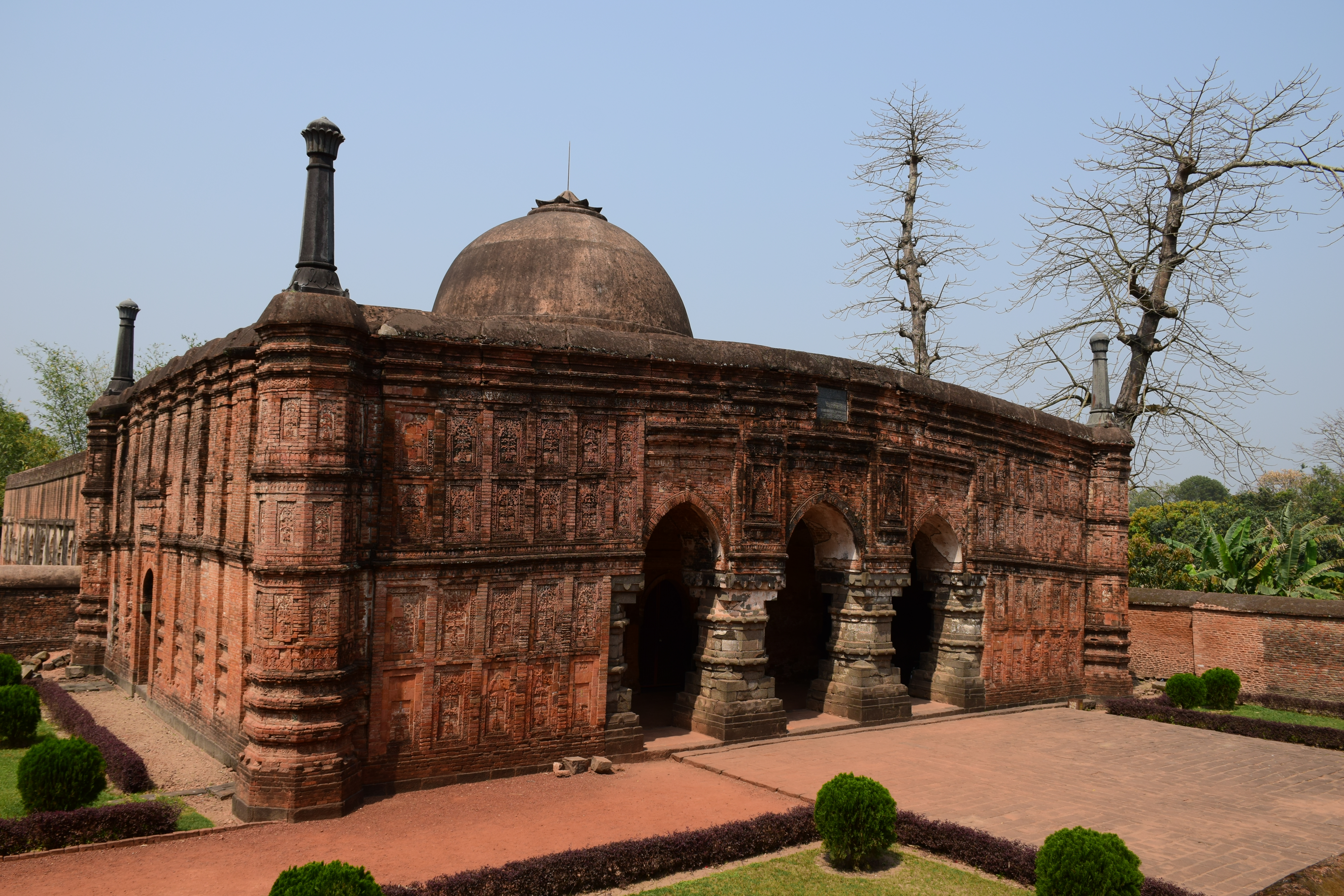
Qadam Rasool Mosque

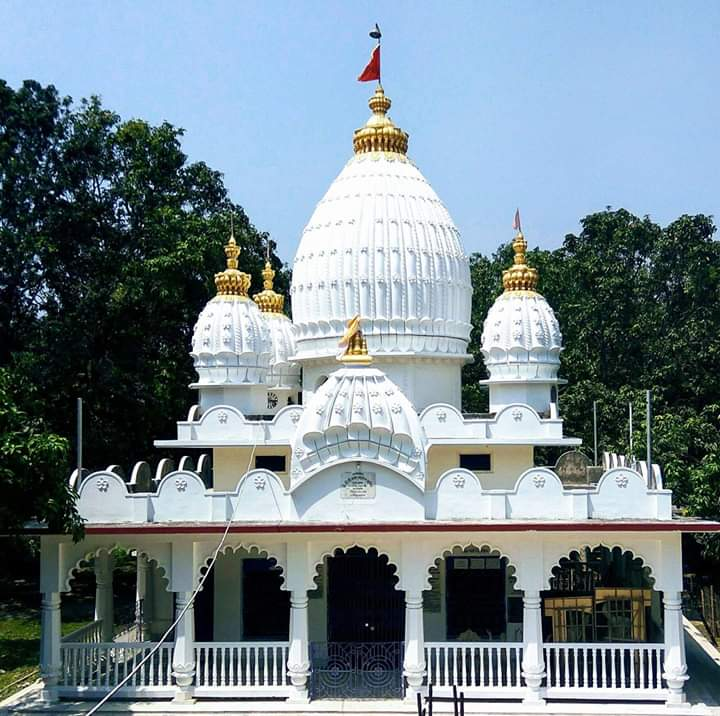
Debipur Haribasar Radhakrishna Mandir

== Education ==
Notable educational institutions of the district include:

=== Schools ===
- Barlow Girls' High School
- Malda Zilla School
- Ramakrishna Mission Vivekananda Vidyamandir

=== Engineering Colleges ===
- Ghani Khan Choudhury Institute of Engineering & Technology
- IMPS College of Engineering and Technology, established - 2003

=== General degree Colleges ===
- Chanchal College
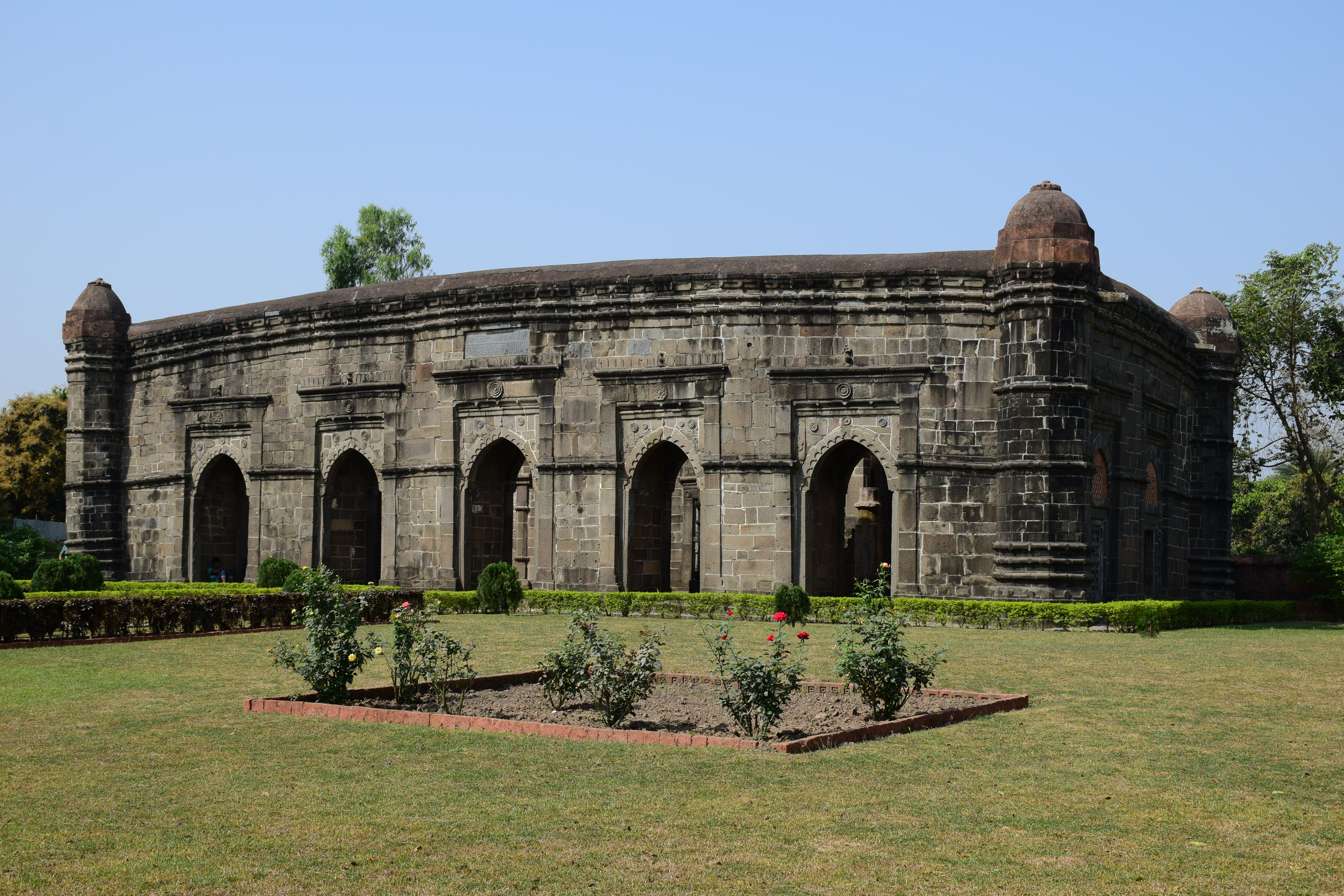
  Qutub Shahi Mosque
- Gour Mahavidyalaya
- Malda College
- Samsi College

=== Medical schools ===
- Malda Medical College and Hospital

=== University ===
- University of Gour Banga

== Notable people ==
- Momtazuddin Ahmed
- Subhamita Banerjee
- Abdur Rahim Boxi
- Sandip Chakrabarti
- Shibram Chakraborty
- A. B. A. Ghani Khan Choudhury
- Abu Hasem Khan Choudhury
- Krishnendu Narayan Choudhury
- Raja Ganesha
- Jiva Goswami
- Tajmul Hossain
- Tafazzal Hossain, politician
- Sabitri Mitra
- Mausam Noor
- Rubi Noor
- Uma Roy
- Krishna Jiban Sanyal
- Benoy Kumar Sarkar, Indian social scientist, professor, nationalist
- Santi Gopal Sen
- Shamsuddin Ilyas Shah
- Jalaluddin Muhammad Shah
- Sikandar Shah
- Bidhushekhar Shastri
- Tapan Sikdar
- Sabina Yeasmin

== See also ==
- History of Bengal
- Gour
- Malda District (1813-1947)
- Chapai Nawabganj District
