= Krishna Jiban Sanyal =

Bengali revolutionary (1893-1925)

Krishna Jiban Sanyal (Kristo)
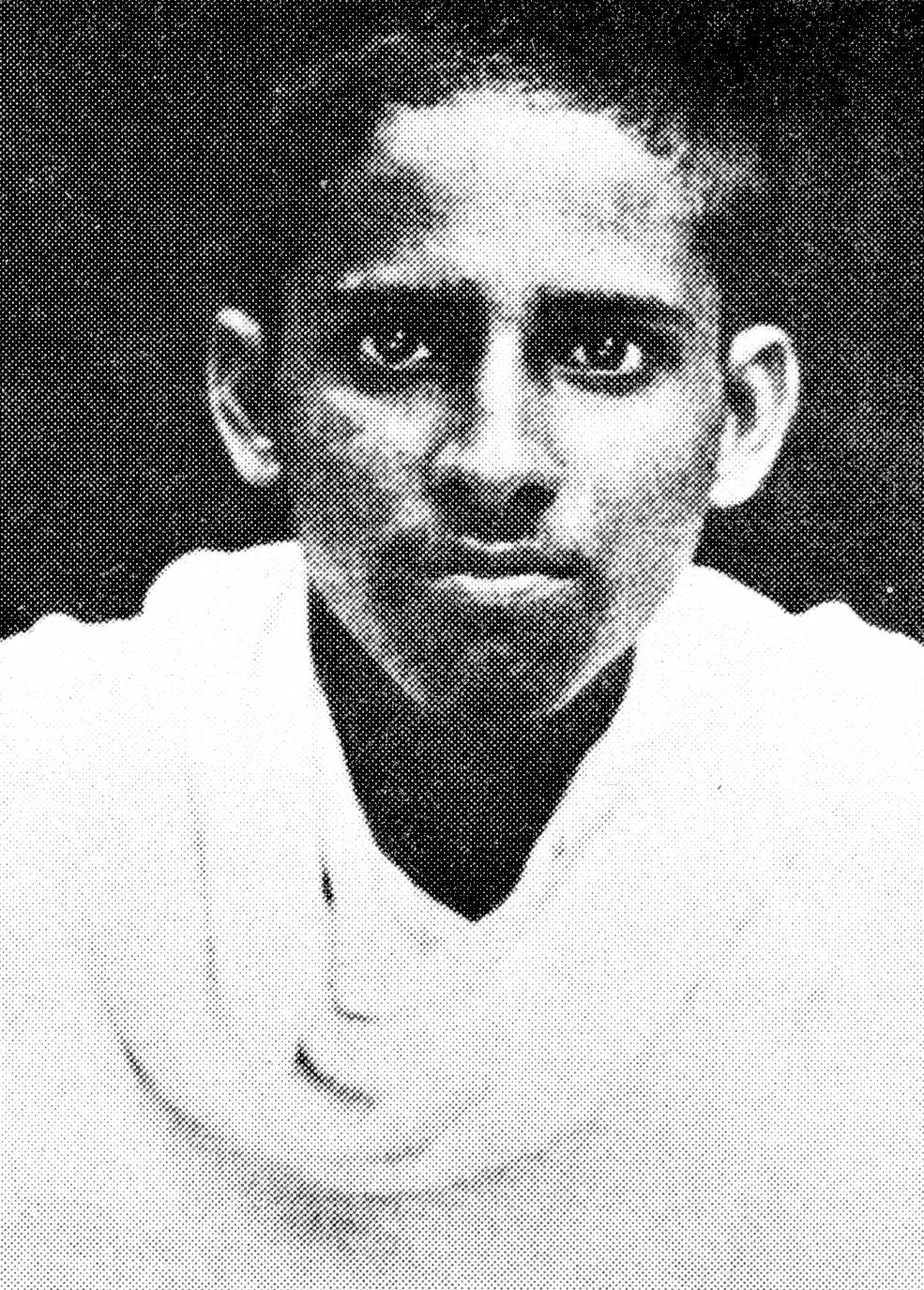
- Krishnajiban sanyal
- Born: 1893; English Bazar, Malda, British India
- Died: 1925; English Bazar, Malda,
- Occupation: Revolutionary
- Organization: Jugantar
- Movement: Indian Freedom Movement

Krishna (Kristo) Jiban Sanyal (1893–1925) participated in the Indian Independence Movement. He was an Indian revolutionary and member of the Jugantar group who carried out assassinations against British colonial officials in an attempt to secure Indian independence.

== Life ==
Krishna (Kristo) Jiban Sanyal was born in Malda. He developed a patriotic spirit from his childhood. He started his education at Malda Zilla School, later he came to Calcutta for higher studies where he was influenced by Nationality spirits and joined Jugantar at an early age. After the Manicktolla bomb conspiracy, a search was occurred at Manicktollah Garden, among the 1500 documents and material evidence found there, were some school books, which belonged to Krishna Jiban. At that time Krishna Jiban was hiding at Malda in his native place. Because of this evidence (his school books) Krishna Jiban was arrested by the police from his hideout on 12 May 1908 at Kanshat, Malda. In Krishna Jiban's house at Malda were found thirty-nine copies of the Yugantar of various dates, some of the copies dating back to 1906 which proves his direct connection with Jugantar. Later he made statement to the Police that "Barin Ghose used to read Gita to me and Upen Banerjee used to read Upanishads to me. Barin also used to read about Russo-Japanese war. Ullaskar Dutt delivered lectures regarding explosives on 2 occasions". In May 1909 Krishna Jiban Sanyal was convicted under Section 121A of the Indian Penal Code found guilty and sentenced to one year's rigorous imprisonment.

== Death ==
He died in 1925.
