= Subhamita Banerjee =

Bengali singer from Malda, West Bengal India

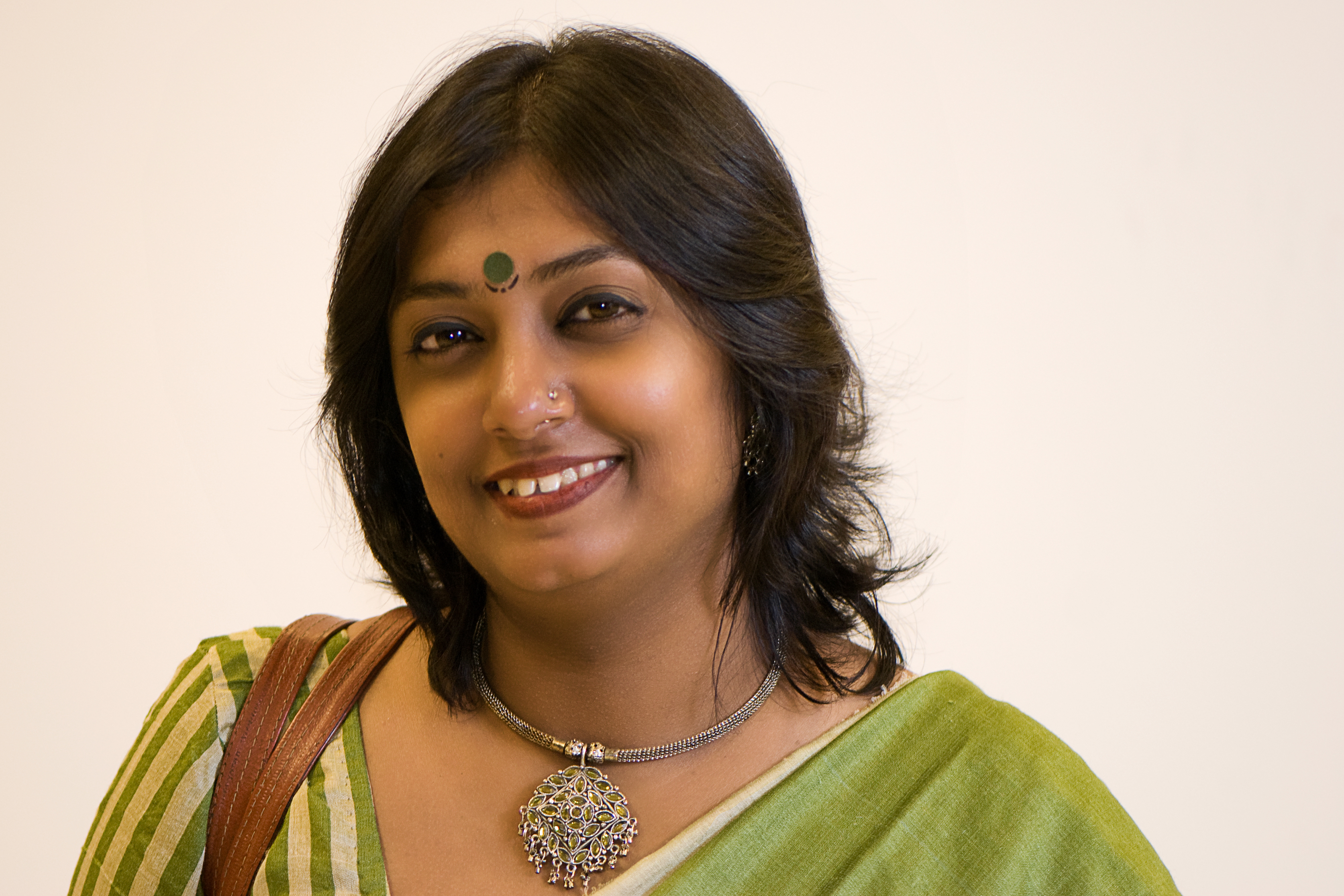

Background information
- Born: 1972 (age 53–54); Malda, West Bengal, India
- Genres: Classical, Modern Bengali Songs, Ghazal
- Occupations: Singer, vocalist, playback singer
- Instrument: Vocals
- Years active: 1990–present
- Label: Sagarika
- Website: www.subhamita.com

Subhamita Banerjee is an Indian Bengali singer who specializes in modern songs, Ghazals etc. She has many Bengali albums to her credit and is one of the well-known singers in the Bengali music industry.

== Personal life ==
Banerjee was born in a Bengali musical family. Her father, Shri Joshoda Dulal Das, a classical vocalist, was her first Guru who gave her the basic training in music. She also took training from gurus including Pandit Ulhas Kashalkar of Jaipur Gwalior Gharana, Aniruddha Bhattacharya of Kirana Gharana and Vidushi Purnima Chowdhury of Benares Gharana and also trained in different classical styles of Purab Ang Thumri, Dadra, Chaiti, Kajri traditions. Subhamita completed her graduation with Honors in English from Kolkata University and Masters in English from Rabindra Bharati University in the 1998.

== Discography ==
- Abishkar -Taal Audio
- Phire Dekha -Taal Audio
- Ichhe Paari (2004) Sagarika Music
- Brishti Paye Paye (2005) Sagarika Music
- Moner Hodish (2006) Sagarika Music
- Gopano Kathati (2006) Sagarika Music
- Jodi Bondhu Hao (2007) Sagarika Music
- Chal Gaan Bhese (2009) Sagarika Music
- Arunobani (2010) Sagarika Music
- Meghe Ora Chithi (Letters in the Sky) (2011) Sagarika Music
- Shreya 'O' Subhamita (2013) Sagarika Music
- Poila Nambar (2014) Ragranjani Media & Entertainment
- Dui Du Gune Prem (2014) Asha Audio
- Tomay Bhalobeshe (2015) Asha Audio
- Ghalibnama (2017) Asha Audio

== Discography (Films) ==
- Bhagshesh: The Remainder (2018)
- Cheeni (2020)

== Awards ==
- Offered Scholarship from ITC Sangeet Research Academy, Kolkata.
- Recipient of National Scholarship from the Government of India in 1992.
- Placed First in His Master's Voice Golden Talent Contest in 1993.
- Placed First in Sa Theke Sa which aired on ETV Bangla.
- Released nearly a dozen album of Bengali Songs.
- Lent voice in more than 200 Tele-Serial and Bengali Films.
- 3 Times Winner of Best Female Singer Award in Tele-Serial Category in 2006, 2007 & 2008.
- Recipient of 3 awards from Anand Bazaar Patrika and 91.9 FM including ‘Best Female Singer Award'
- Best Female Singer Award – Radio Mirchi −2012
- Adhunik Female Vocalist of the Decade Sherar Shera - Smule Mirchi Music Awards Bangla, co-powered by Shikhar Pan Masala −2021
- Awarded 17th Tumi Annanya 2022 for Excellence in Music

== Performances ==
- Special performance in Pandit Ravi Shankarji's project in the event "India Calling" in Los Angeles, United States in 2009.
- Her song in the film Memories in March got immensely popular and which was written by Rituparna Ghosh and directed by Debojyoti Mishra
- In July 2011 she performed in a music festival called Guru Shishya Parampara organized jointly by East Zone Cultural Centre and SRA
- She participated in the ITC SRA Sangeet Sammelan in 2011
