= Chanchal (disambiguation) =

Chanchal is a town in Malda, West Bengal, India.

Chanchal may also refer to:

== Places ==
- Chanchal College, a college in Malda, West Bengal, India
- Chanchal (Vidhan Sabha constituency), an assembly constituency in Malda, West Bengal, India
- Chanchal subdivision, Malda, West Bengal, India
- Chanchal I (community development block), an administrative division in Malda, West Bengal, India

== People ==
- Chanchal (actress), Indian actress
- Chanchal Chowdhury, Bangladeshi actor
- Narendra Chanchal, an Indian playback singer
