= Araidanga =

- Populated place
- Location in West Bengal, India Araidanga (India)
- Coordinates: 25.117441°N 87.988111°E
- Country: India
- State: West Bengal
- District: Malda

Languages
  - Official: Bengali, English
- Time zone: UTC+5:30 (IST)
- PIN: 732214
- Telephone/ STD code: 03512
- Vehicle registration: WB
- Lok Sabha constituency: Maldaha Uttar
- Vidhan Sabha constituency: Ratua
- Website: malda.nic.in

Araidanga is a populated place, not identified as a separate place in 2011 census, in the Ratua II CD block in the Chanchal subdivision of Malda district in the state of West Bengal, India.

== Geography ==
Cities, towns and locations in the northern portion of Malda district (including Chanchal subdivision and Old Malda, Habibpur, Bamangola and Gazole CD blocks)
M: municipal town, CT: census town, R: rural/ urban centre, F: Facility, H: historical centre
Owing to space constraints in the small map, the actual locations in a larger map may vary slightly

=== Location ===
Araidanga is located at 25.117441°N 87.988111°E.

Araidanga is a gram panchayat.

=== Area overview ===
The area shown in the adjacent map covers two physiographic regions – the Barind in the east and the tal in the west. The eastern part is comparatively high (up to 40 metres above mean sea level at places) and uneven. The soils of the eastern region are "hard salty clays of a reddish hue and the ground is baked hard as iron." It lies to the east of the Mahananda River. The area lying to the west of the Mahananda River, the tal, is a flat low land and "is strewn with innumerable marshes, bils and oxbow lakes." The tal area is prone to flooding by local rivers. The total area is overwhelmingly rural. There are two important historical/ archaeological sites in the area – Pandua and Jagjivanpur.

Note: The map alongside presents some of the notable locations in the area. All places marked in the map are linked in the larger full screen map.

== Education ==
Araidanga DBM Academy is a Bengali-medium coeducational institution established in 1865. It has facilities for teaching from class V to class XII. It has a playground, a library with 361 books, and 15 computers for teaching and learning purposes.

== Healthcare ==
Araidanga Rural Hospital, with 30 beds, is the main government medical facility in Ratua II CD block.

== See also ==
- Araidanga (Vidhan Sabha constituency)
