= Kharba =

- Village
- Location in West Bengal, India Kharba (India)
- Coordinates: 25.42°N 88.07°E
- Country: India
- State: West Bengal
- District: Malda

Government
  - MLA: Mahabubul Haque
- Elevation: 29 m (95 ft)

Population (2011)
  - Total: 3,744

Languages
  - Official: Bengali
  - Additional official: English
- Time zone: UTC+5:30 (IST)
- ISO 3166 code: IN-WB
- Vehicle registration: WB
- Lok Sabha constituency: Maldaha Uttar
- Vidhan Sabha constituency: Chanchal
- Website: malda.nic.in

Kharba is a village in Chanchal I CD Block in Chanchal subdivision of Malda district in the Indian state of West Bengal. The town is located on the western banks of the Mahananda River.

== Geography ==
Cities, towns and locations in the northern portion of Malda district (including Chanchal subdivision and Old Malda, Habibpur, Bamangola and Gazole CD blocks)
M: municipal town, CT: census town, R: rural/ urban centre, F: Facility, H: historical centre
Owing to space constraints in the small map, the actual locations in a larger map may vary slightly

=== Location ===
Kharba is located at 25.42°N 88.07°E. It has an average elevation of 29 m (95 ft).

Kharba is a village panchayat under Chanchal I intermediate panchayat in Malda district.:

=== Area overview ===
The area shown in the adjacent map covers two physiographic regions – the Barind in the east and the tal in the west. The eastern part is comparatively high (up to 40 metres above mean sea level at places) and uneven. The soils of the eastern region are “hard salty clays of a reddish hue and the ground is baked hard as iron.” It lies to the east of the Mahananda River. The area lying to the west of the Mahananda River, the tal, is a flat low land and “is strewn with innumerable marshes, bils and oxbow lakes.” The tal area is prone to flooding by local rivers. The total area is overwhelmingly rural. There are two important historical/ archaeological sites in the area – Pandua and Jagjivanpur.

Note: The map alongside presents some of the notable locations in the area. All places marked in the map are linked in the larger full screen map.

== Demographics ==
As per the 2011 Census of India, Kharba had a total population of 3,744, of which 1,914 (51%) were males and 1,830 (49%) were females. Population below 6 years was 435. The total number of literates in Kharb was 2,835 (72.08% of the population over 6 years).

== Healthcare ==
Chanchal subdivisional hospital at Chanchal (with 100 beds) is a major medical facility. There are primary health centres in Chanchal I CD Block at Kharba (with 10 beds) and Singla (Nadishik PHC) (with 10 beds).

== See also ==
- Kharba (Vidhan Sabha constituency)
