= Samsi, Malda =

City in Malda (West Bengal), India

Samsi
- Village
- Location in West Bengal, India Samsi (India)
- Coordinates: 25°16′33″N 88°00′18″E
- Country: India
- State: West Bengal
- District: Maldah
- Subdistrict: Ratua I

Population (2011)
  - Total: 48,989

Languages
  - Official: Bengali
  - Additional official: English
- Time zone: UTC+05:30 (IST)
- Pincode: 732139
- Telephone code: 03513

Samsi is a village in Ratua I block in Chanchal subdivision of Malda district of Indian state of West Bengal.

== Geography ==
Cities, towns and locations in the northern portion of Malda district (including Chanchal subdivision and Old Malda, Habibpur, Bamangola and Gazole CD blocks)
M: municipal town, CT: census town, R: rural/ urban centre, F: Facility, H: historical centre
Owing to space constraints in the small map, the actual locations in a larger map may vary slightly

=== Location ===
Sahibganj, Manihari, Raiganj and Katihar are the nearby cities. It is in the border of Maldah District and Katihar District and is near to the Bihar state border.

=== Area overview ===
The area shown in the adjacent map covers two physiographic regions – the Barind in the east and the tal in the west. The eastern part is comparatively high (up to 40 metres above mean sea level at places) and uneven. The soils of the eastern region are “hard salty clays of a reddish hue and the ground is baked hard as iron.” It lies to the east of the Mahananda River. The area lying to the west of the Mahananda River, the tal, is a flat low land and “is strewn with innumerable marshes, bils and oxbow lakes.” The tal area is prone to flooding by local rivers. The total area is overwhelmingly rural. There are two important historical/ archaeological sites in the area – Pandua and Jagjivanpur.

Note: The map alongside presents some of the notable locations in the area. All places marked in the map are linked in the larger full screen map.

== Demographics ==
As per the 2011 Census of India, Samsi had a total population of 48989, of which 25,200 (51%) were males and 23789 (49%) were females. Population below 6 years was 276. The total number of literate people was 2,056 (85.31% of the population over 6 years).

== Transport ==
Samsi railway station is on the Howrah–New Jalpaiguri line.

National Highway 31 starts from Unnao in Uttar Pradesh and passes through Bihar and terminates at its crossing with State Highway 10 (West Bengal) at Samsi, as shown in Google maps.

== Education ==
Samsi College, established at Kandaran in 1968, is located near Samsi. It is affiliated with the University of Gour Banga. It offers honours courses in Arabic, Bengali, English, Sanskrit, history, geography, philosophy, political science, economics and sociology, and general courses in arts and commerce. It has a boys hostel and a girls hostel is under construction.

== Healthcare ==
Ratua Rural Hospital at Ratua (with 30 beds) is the main medical facility in Ratua I CD Block. There are primary health centres at Debipur (with 10 beds), Mahanandatola (with 10 beds) and Samsi (with 10 beds).
