= Pukhuria =

- Village
- Location in West Bengal, India Pukhuria (India) Pukhuria (Asia)
- Coordinates: 25.133661°N 88.028377°E
- Country: India
- State: West Bengal
- District: Malda

Population (2011)
  - Total: 22,550

Languages
  - Official: Bengali
  - Additional official: English
- Time zone: UTC+5:30 (IST)
- PIN: 732213
- STD/ Telephone code: 03512
- Lok Sabha constituency: Maldaha Uttar
- Vidhan Sabha constituency: Ratua
- Website: malda.nic.in

Pukhuria is a village in the Ratua II CD block in the Chanchal subdivision of Malda district in the state of West Bengal, India.

== Geography ==
Cities, towns and locations in the northern portion of Malda district (including Chanchal subdivision and Old Malda, Habibpur, Bamangola and Gazole CD blocks)
M: municipal town, CT: census town, R: rural/ urban centre, F: Facility, H: historical centre
Owing to space constraints in the small map, the actual locations in a larger map may vary slightly

=== Location ===
Pukhuria is located at 25.133661°N 88.028377°E.

The Mahananda flows nearby. There is a bridge across the river at Pukhuria.

=== Area overview ===
The area shown in the adjacent map covers two physiographic regions – the Barind in the east and the tal in the west. The eastern part is comparatively high (up to 40 metres above mean sea level at places) and uneven. The soils of the eastern region are “hard salty clays of a reddish hue and the ground is baked hard as iron.” It lies to the east of the Mahananda River. The area lying to the west of the Mahananda River, the tal, is a flat low land and “is strewn with innumerable marshes, bils and oxbow lakes.” The tal area is prone to flooding by local rivers. The total area is overwhelmingly rural. There are two important historical/ archaeological sites in the area – Pandua and Jagjivanpur.

Note: The map alongside presents some of the notable locations in the area. All places marked in the map are linked in the larger full screen map.

== Civic administration ==
=== Police station ===
Pukuhuria police station under West Bengal police has jurisdiction over Ratua II CD block.

=== CD block HQ ===
The headquarters of Ratua II CD block is at Pukhuria.

== Demographics ==
According to the 2011 Census of India, Pukhuria had a total population of 22,550, of which 11,457 (51%) were males and 11,093 (49%) were females. Population in the age range 0–6 years was 3,348. The total number of literate persons in Pukuhuria was 10,782 (56.15% of the population over 6 years).

== Education ==
Pukhuria High School, established in 1932, is a co-educational Bengali-medium higher secondary school with arrangements for teaching from class VI to XII. It has a library with 2,000 books, 12 computers and a play ground. It is housed in a government building.

== Healthcare ==
There is a primary health centre at Khailsona nearby.
