= Ratua =

- Town
- Location in West Bengal, India Ratua (India) Ratua (Asia)
- Coordinates: 25.2001°N 87.9274°E
- Country: India
- State: West Bengal
- District: Malda

Population (2011)
  - Total: 5,498

Languages
  - Official: Bengali
  - Additional official: English
- Time zone: UTC+5:30 (IST)
- PIN: 732205
- STD/ Telephone code: 03513
- Lok Sabha constituency: Maldaha Uttar
- Vidhan Sabha constituency: Ratua
- Website: malda.nic.in

Ratua is a town in the Ratua I CD block in the Chanchal subdivision of Malda district in the state of West Bengal, India.

== Geography ==
Cities, towns and locations in the northern portion of Malda district (including Chanchal subdivision and Old Malda, Habibpur, Bamangola and Gazole CD blocks)
M: municipal town, CT: census town, R: rural/ urban centre, F: Facility, H: historical centre
Owing to space constraints in the small map, the actual locations in a larger map may vary slightly

=== Location ===
Ratua is located at 25.2001°N 87.9274°E.

=== Area overview ===
The area shown in the adjacent map covers two physiographic regions – the Barind in the east and the tal in the west. The eastern part is comparatively high (up to 40 metres above mean sea level at places) and uneven. The soils of the eastern region are “hard salty clays of a reddish hue and the ground is baked hard as iron.” It lies to the east of the Mahananda River. The area lying to the west of the Mahananda River, the tal, is a flat low land and “is strewn with innumerable marshes, bils and oxbow lakes.” The tal area is prone to flooding by local rivers. The total area is overwhelmingly rural. There are two important historical/ archaeological sites in the area – Pandua and Jagjivanpur.

Note: The map alongside presents some of the notable locations in the area. All places marked in the map are linked in the larger full screen map.

== Civic administration ==
=== Police station ===
Ratua police station under West Bengal police has jurisdiction over Ratua I CD block.

=== CD block HQ ===
The headquarters of Ratua I CD block is at Ratua.

== Demographics ==
According to the 2011 Census of India, Ratua had a total population of 5,498, of which 2,850 (52%) were males and 2,648 (48%) were females. Population in the age range 0–6 years was 800. The total number of literate persons in Ratua was 3,053 (64.99% of the population over 6 years).

== Transport ==
Ratua is on National Highway 131A/ State Highway 10 (partly common route).

There are bus and minibus services to local towns

The nearest railway station is located at Samsi. It is well connected to Kolkata, Delhi, Siliguri, Katihar with various express train.

== Healthcare ==
Ratua Rural Hospital at Ratua (with 30 beds) is the main medical facility in Ratua I CD block. There are primary health centres at Debipur (with 10 beds), Mahanandatola (with 10 beds) and Samsi (with 10 beds).
