= Charu Chandra Bandyopadhyay =

Indian Poet (1877–1938)

- Born: 11 October 1877; Chanchal, Bengal Presidency, British Raj
- Died: 17 December 1938 (aged 61); Calcutta, Bengal Presidency, British India
- Education: Scottish Church College, Presidency College
- Occupations: Magazine Editor; Translator; Short Story Writer
- Spouse(s): Radharani Devi(d.1900); Padmabati Devi
- Children: Kanak Bandyopadhyay
- Parent(s): Gopal Chandra Bandyopadhyay (father), Muktakeshi Debi (mother)

Charu Chandra Bandyopadhyay (11 October 1877 – 17 December 1938) was an Indian Bengali writer and Journalist. He was the co-editor of Prabasi and short term editor of Bharati literature magazine. He also worked as the editor and translator of the publishing firm Indian Publishing House.

== Early life and education ==
Bandyopadhyay was born on 11 October 1877 in Chanchal, Malda, India. However, his original residence was in Jessore. His father's name was Gopalchandra Bandyopadhyay. His mother's name was Muktakeshi Devi.

He passed the entrance exam from Balagarh High School in 1895. He passed his F.A. from General Assemblies (now Scottish Church College) in 1896. In the same year, he married Radharani Devi, a resident of Dumka. He passed his B.A. from Presidency College in 1899. Radharani died four years later in 1900. Later, he married Padmavati Devi.

== Career ==
Charuchandra's literary career began as a critic of Sanskrit literature in magazines such as 'Meghdoot' and 'Magh'. He joined the Indian Publishing House and became a distinguished editor and translator in the field of book publishing. For some time, he was the editor of the magazine "Bharati". He became widely known as the co-editor of 'Probasi'. His first original work, the short story "Maromer Kotha", was published in Prabasi. He was skilled in Bengali language and phonology. In 1919, he joined the Bengali Department of the Calcutta University as a professor. He moved to Dhaka in 1924 to join the University of Dhaka as a professor. In 1928, he received an honorary M.A. degree from the University of Dhaka. Among the notable writers of the 19th and 20th centuries, Charuchandra's name must also be mentioned along with Indira Devi, Anurupa Debi, Sailajananda Mukhopadhyay, Rajshekhar Basu and others. 'Shroter Phul', 'Pargacha' etc. are among the 25 novels he has written. He has also written for children and has published translations of several books suitable for children. He has successfully translated the play 'Abimaraka' by the great poet Bhasa and several novels and children's books. 'Bhater Janmakatha' is one of his particularly notable children's books. However, he is best known for his Rabindra-research book 'Ravi-Rashmi'.

== Works ==
- Aguner Phulki (1914)
- Serater Phool (1915)
- Pargacha (1917)
- Dui Teer (1918)
- Herfer (1918)
- Pankatilak (1919)
- Dotana (1920)
- Alokpaat (1920)
- Ruper Phande (1925)
- Kavikankan-Chandi
- Sur Bandha (1937)
- Agnihotri (1938)
- Ravi rashmi
- Jayashree

== Death ==
He died on 17 December 1938 at age of 61 in Calcutta.
