= Ratua I =

- Community development block
- Interactive map of Ratua I
- Coordinates: 25.20°N 87.93°E
- Country: India
- State: West Bengal
- District: Malda

Government
  - Type: Representative democracy
  - Body: Panchayat Samity (Executive Officer/BDO)

Area
  - Total: 225.17 km^{2} (86.94 sq mi)

Population (2011)
  - Total: 275,388
  - Density: 1,223.0/km^{2} (3,167.6/sq mi)

Languages
  - Official: Bengali, English
- Time zone: UTC+5:30 (IST)
- PIN: 732205
- STD/telephone code: 03513
- ISO 3166 code: IN-WB
- Lok Sabha constituency: Maldaha Uttar
- Vidhan Sabha constituency: Ratua
- Website: malda.nic.in

Ratua I is a community development block that forms an administrative division in Chanchal subdivision of Malda district in the Indian state of West Bengal.

== History ==
=== Gauda and Pandua ===
Gauda was once the "capital of the ancient bhukti or political division of Bengal known as Pundravardhana which lay on the eastern extremity of the Gupta Empire." During the rule of the Sena Dynasty, in the 11th-12th century, Gauda was rebuilt and extended as Lakshmanawati (later Lakhnauti), and it became the hub of the Sena empire. Gauda was conquered by Muhammad bin Bakhtiyar Khalji in 1205. During the Turko-Afghan period, "the city of Lakhnauti or Gauda continued to function initially as their capital but was abandoned in 1342 by the Ilyas Shahi sultans in favour of Pandua because of major disturbances along the river course of the Ganga." "Pandua then lay on the banks of the Mahananda, which was the major waterway of the sultanate at the time. However, when the Mahananda too began to veer away from the site of Pandua in the mid-15th century, Gauda was rebuilt and restored to the status of capital city by the Hussain Shahi sultans"... With the ascent of Akbar to the Mughal throne at Delhi... the Mughals annexed the ancient region of Gauda in 1576 and created the Diwani of Bengal. The centre of regional power shifted across the Ganga to Rajmahal. Following the demise of the independent sultanate, the regional importance of the Gauda or Malda region declined irreversibly and the city of Gauda was eventually abandoned.

=== Malda district ===
With the advent of the British, their trading and commercial interests focussed on the new cities of Malda and English Bazar. Malda district was formed in 1813 with "some portion of outlying areas of Purnia, Dinajpur and Rajshahi districts". A separate treasury was established in 1832 and a full-fledged Magistrate and Collector was posted in 1859. Malda district was part of Rajshahi Division till 1876, when it was transferred to Bhagalpur Division, and again transferred in 1905 to Rajshahi Division. With the partition of Bengal in 1947, the Radcliffe Line placed Malda district in India, except the Nawabganj subdivision, which was placed in East Pakistan.

== Geography ==
Ratua is located at 25°12′N 87°56′E.

Ratua I CD Block is part of the Tal, one of the three physiographic sub-regions of the district. "The Tal region gradually slopes down towards the south-west and merges with the Diara sub-region… (it) is strewn with innumerable marshes, bils and oxbow lakes." The sub-region largely remains submerged during the monsoons and during the dry season large sections of it turn into mud banks with many shallow marshes scattered around. With hardly any gradient the rivers crawl through the region. The Kalindri River flows along the CD Block.

Debipur, Mahanandatola, Bilaimari, Kahala and Baharal gram panchayats in Ratua I CD Block are vulnerable to floods from the adjoining Fulahar, Koshi and Kalindri rivers.

Ratua I CD Block is bounded by Harishchandrapur II CD Block and Chanchal II CD Block on the north, Ratua II CD Block on the east, Manikchak CD Block on the south and Amdabad CD Block of Katihar district of Bihar on the west.

Ratua I CD Block has an area of 225.17 km^{2}. It has 1 panchayat samity, 10 gram panchayats, 166 gram sansads (village councils), 101 mouzas and 95 inhabited villages. Ratua police station serves this block. Headquarters of this CD Block is at Ratua.

Gram panchayats of Ratua I block/ panchayat samiti are: Debipur, Mahanandatola, Bilaimari, Kahala, Ratua, Baharal, Bhado, Samsi, Chadmoni I and Chandmoni II.

== Demographics ==
=== Population ===
As per 2011 Census of India, Ratua I CD Block had a total population of 275,388, all of which were rural. There were 142,183 (52%) males and 133,205 (48%) females. Population below 6 years was 45,676. Scheduled Castes numbered 30,538 (11.09%) and Scheduled Tribes numbered 23,458 (8.52%).

Large villages (with 4,000+ population) in Ratua I CD Block were (2011 population in brackets): Gadai Maharajpur (15,023), Kamalpur (6,802), Maniknagar (8,877), Balupur (10,808), Durgapur (5,366), Debipur (4,070), Jannagar (4,140 ), Austola (4,880), Ratua (5,498), Rukundipur (7,260), Karbana (4,046), Bihari (4,183), Bahirkap (4,549), Bhado (17,190), Kankot (6,491), Parakaram (6,386), Okhra Chandpara (5,196), Chhabilpara (6,479), Andhirampara (5,041), Bijrabhita (5,513), Lakshmipur (4,170), Santapur (5,322), Talparanpur (4,618), Dakshin Durgapur (4,219) and Sahapur (5,005).

Other villages in Ratua I CD Block included (2011 population in brackets): Samsi (2,686) and Baharai (2,775).

Decadal Population Growth Rate (%)

Note: The CD Block data for 1971–1981, 1981-1991 and 1991-2001 is for both Ratua I & II taken together

The decadal growth of population in Ratua I CD Block in 2001-2011 was 26.70%. The decadal growth of population in Ratua PS or Ratua I & II CD Blocks taken together in 1991-2001 was 26.33%. The decadal growth of population in Ratua PS or Ratua I &II CD Blocks taken together in 1981-91 was 24.14% and in 1971-81 was 23.59%. The decadal growth rate of population in Malda district was as follows: 30.33% in 1951–61, 31.98% in 1961–71, 26.00% in 1971–81, 29.78% in 1981–91, 24.78% in 1991-2001 and 21.22% in 2001-11. The decadal growth rate for West Bengal in 2001-11 was 13.93%. The decadal growth rate for West Bengal was 13.93 in 2001–2011, 17.77% in 1991-2001. 24.73% in 1981-1991 and 23.17% in 1971-1981.

Malda district has the second highest decadal population growth rate, for the decade 2001–2011, in West Bengal with a figure of 21.2% which is much higher than the state average (13.8%). Uttar Dinajpur district has the highest decadal growth rate in the state with 23.2%. Decadal growth rate of population is higher than that of neighbouring Murshidabad district, which has the next highest growth rate.

Population density in the district has intensified from 162 persons per km^{2} in 1901 to 881 in 2001 (i.e., around five times), which is highest amongst the districts of North Bengal. However, unlike the densely populated southern regions of West Bengal, urbanisation remains low in Malda district. North Bengal in general, and Malda in particular, has been witness to large scale population movement from other states in India, as well as from outside the country. The District Human Development Report for Malda notes, "Malda district has been a principal recipient of the human migration waves of the 20th century."

There are reports of Bangladeshi infiltrators coming through the international border. Only a small portion of the border with Bangladesh has been fenced and it is popularly referred to as a porous border.

=== Literacy ===
As per the 2011 census, the total number of literates in Ratua I CD Block was 138,137 (60.13% of the population over 6 years) out of which males numbered 76,280 (64.17% of the male population over 6 years) and females numbered 61,857 (55.81% of the female population over 6 years). The gender disparity (the difference between female and male literacy rates) was 8.36%.

See also – List of West Bengal districts ranked by literacy rate

Literacy in CD blocks of
Malda district
Malda Sadar subdivision
Gazole – 63.07%
Bamangola – 68.09%
Habibpur – 58.81%
Old Malda – 59.61%
English Bazar – 63.03%
Manikchak – 57.77%
Kaliachak I – 65.25%
Kaliachak II – 64.89%
Kaliachak III – 54.16%
Chanchal subdivision
Harishchandrapur I – 52.47%
Harishchandrapur II – 54.34%
Chanchal I – 65.09%
Chanchal II – 57.38%
Ratua I – 60.13%
Ratua II – 56.19%
Source: 2011 Census: CD Block Wise
Primary Census Abstract Data

=== Language and religion ===
Religion in Ratua I CD block (2011)
Islam	66.88%
Hinduism	32.97%
Other or not stated	0.11%

Islam is the majority religion, with 66.88% of the population. Hinduism is the second-largest religion.

As per 2014 District Statistical Handbook: Malda (quoting census figures), in the 2001 census, Muslims numbered 141,895 and formed 65.28% of the population in Ratua I CD Block. Hindus numbered 74,900 and formed 34.46% of the population. Christians numbered 20 and formed 0.01% of the population. Others numbered 541 and formed 0.25% of the population.

Bengali is the predominant language, spoken by 98.27% of the population.

== Rural poverty ==
As per the Human Development Report for Malda district, published in 2006, the percentage of rural families in BPL category in Ratua I CD Block was 25.6%, which was considerably lower than the average poverty level in Malda district. Official surveys have found households living in absolute poverty in Malda district to be around 39%.

According to the report, "An overwhelmingly large segment of the rural workforce depends on agriculture as its main source of livelihood, the extent of landlessness in Malda has traditionally been high because of the high densities of human settlement in the district… Although land reforms were implemented in Malda district from the time they were launched in other parts of West Bengal, their progress has been uneven across the Malda blocks… because of the overall paucity of land, the extent of ceiling-surplus land available for redistribution has never been large… The high levels of rural poverty that exist in nearly all blocks in Malda district closely reflect the livelihood crisis… "

== Economy ==
=== Livelihood ===
Livelihood
in Ratua I CD Block
1. Cultivators (22.2%)
2. Agricultural labourers (43.0%)
3. Household industries (6.93%)
4. Other Workers (27.8%)

In Ratua I CD Block in 2011, amongst the class of total workers, cultivators numbered 20,093 and formed 22.24%, agricultural labourers numbered 38,870 and formed 43.02%, household industry workers numbered 6,258 and formed 6.93% and other workers numbered 25,137 and formed 27.82%. Total workers numbered 90,358 and formed 32.81% of the total population, and non-workers numbered 185,030 and formed 67.19% of the population.

Note: In the census records a person is considered a cultivator, if the person is engaged in cultivation/ supervision of land owned by self/government/institution. When a person who works on another person's land for wages in cash or kind or share, is regarded as an agricultural labourer. Household industry is defined as an industry conducted by one or more members of the family within the household or village, and one that does not qualify for registration as a factory under the Factories Act. Other workers are persons engaged in some economic activity other than cultivators, agricultural labourers and household workers. It includes factory, mining, plantation, transport and office workers, those engaged in business and commerce, teachers, entertainment artistes and so on.

=== Infrastructure ===
There are 95 inhabited villages in Ratua I CD Block. All 95 villages (100%) have power supply. 93 villages (97.89%) have drinking water supply. 20 villages (21.05%) have post offices. 86 villages (90.53%) have telephones (including landlines, public call offices and mobile phones). 42 villages (44.21%) have a pucca (paved) approach road and 29 villages (30.53%) have transport communication (includes bus service, rail facility and navigable waterways). 7 villages (7.37%) have agricultural credit societies. 7 villages (7.37%) have banks.

The principal market yard under the West Bengal Marketing Board is situated at Samsi (Samsi Regulated Market Committee). The main markets of Ratua-I block are Samsi, Bhado, Ratua, Debipur, Baharal, Batna and Harikole-Basic More.

=== Agriculture ===
"Because of its alluvial soils and the abundance of rivers, large and small, Malda has been an important agricultural region since antiquity, leading to dense human settlement within the boundaries of the district. Rice yields have traditionally been high, making it the breadbasket of North Bengal. But the shifting of rivers and overall ecological change have left an inevitable stamp on the present patterns of human settlement, as a consequence of which settlement densities vary considerably across the district… Agricultural land in the Tal and Diara is mostly irrigated and intensively cropped and cultivated… Rainfall in the district is moderate…"

Ratua I CD Block had 104 fertiliser depots, 7 seed stores and 47 fair price shops in 2013-14.

In 2013–14, Ratua I CD Block produced 3,346 tonnes of Aman paddy, the main winter crop from 1,132 hectares, 18,663 tonnes of Boro paddy (spring crop) from 4,504 hectares, 247 tonnes of Aus paddy (summer crop) from 127 hectares, 14,653 tonnes of wheat from 4,643 hectares, 2,311 tonnes of maize from 649 hectares, 50,129 tonnes of jute from 3,270 hectares, 6,966 tonnes of potatoes from 203 hectares and 10,339 tonnes of sugar cane from 101 hectares. It also produced pulses and oilseeds .

In 2013–14, the total area irrigated in Ratua I CD Block was 9,747 hectares, out of which 1,021 hectares were irrigated by river lift irrigation, 692 hectares by deep tube wells, 7,048 hectares by shallow tube wells and 986 hectares by other means.

=== Mango ===
25,500 hectares of land in Malda district produces mango varieties such as langra, himasagar, amrapali, laxmanbhog, gopalbhog and fazli. The core area of mango production is Old Malda, English Bazar and Manikchak CD Blocks, from where it has spread to Kaliachak I & II, Ratua I & II and Chanchal I CD Blocks.

=== Backward Regions Grant Fund ===
Malda district is listed as a backward region and receives financial support from the Backward Regions Grant Fund. The fund, created by the Government of India, is designed to redress regional imbalances in development. As of 2012, 272 districts across the country were listed under this scheme. The list includes 11 districts of West Bengal.

== Transport ==
In 2013–14, Ratua I CD Block had 6 ferry services and 5 originating/ terminating bus routes. The nearest railway station is 13 km from the CD Block headquarters.

Samsi railway station is on the Howrah–New Jalpaiguri line.

== Culture ==
Shakti Mishra's Durga Mandir at Kahala is a temple in a remote village with its underground construction where the idol of Durga, made of pure gold, is kept, every people has been invited to join in Durga puja which is the fame of Ratua and how it is effective. one Dargha (Muslim Pir) near Ratua (Kamalpur) is also famous.

== Education ==
In 2013–14, Ratua I CD Block had 121 primary schools with 28,975 students, 14 middle school with 4,845 students, 11 high schools with 22,052 students and 11 higher secondary schools with 27,935 students. Ratua I CD Block had 1 general degree college with 5,064 students and 354 institutions for special and non-formal education with 19,621 students.

As per the 2011 census, in Ratua I CD Block, amongst the 95 inhabited villages, 12 villages did not have a school, 46 villages had more than 1 primary school, 37 villages had at least 1 primary and 1 middle school and 21 villages had at least 1 middle and 1 secondary school.

== Healthcare ==
In 2014, Ratua I CD Block had 1 rural hospital, 1 block primary health centre and 2 primary health centres, with total 80 beds and 9 doctors (excluding private bodies). It had 36 family welfare sub centres. 5,652 patients were treated indoor and 227,686 patients were treated outdoor in the hospitals, health centres and sub centres of the CD Block.

Ratua Rural Hospital at Ratua (with 35 beds) is the main medical facility in Ratua I CD Block. There are primary health centres at Debipur (with 10 beds), Mahananda Tola (with 10 beds) and Samsi (with 10 beds).

The Arsenic free water supply plant is situated at Kahala under Ratua-I block. The biggest development of Kahala is Arsenic free water project which is over Ganga river.
