= Chanchal II =

- Community development block
- Interactive map of Chanchal II
- Coordinates: 25.332088°N 88.019196°E
- Country: India
- State: West Bengal
- District: Malda

Government
  - Type: Representative democracy

Area
  - Total: 205.22 km^{2} (79.24 sq mi)

Population (2011)
  - Total: 205,333
  - Density: 1,000.6/km^{2} (2,591.4/sq mi)

Languages
  - Official: Bengali, English
- Time zone: UTC+5:30 (IST)
- PIN: 732123
- STD/telephone code: 03513
- Lok Sabha constituency: Maldaha Uttar
- Vidhan Sabha constituency: Malatipur
- Website: malda.nic.in

Chanchal II is a community development block that forms an administrative division in Chanchal subdivision of Malda district in the Indian state of West Bengal.

== History ==
=== Gauda and Pandua ===
Gauda was once the "capital of the ancient bhukti or political division of Bengal known as Pundravardhana which lay on the eastern extremity of the Gupta Empire." During the rule of the Sena Dynasty, in the 11th-12th century, Gauda was rebuilt and extended as Lakshmanawati (later Lakhnauti), and it became the hub of the Sena empire. Gauda was conquered by Muhammad bin Bakhtiyar Khalji in 1205. During the Turko-Afghan period, "the city of Lakhnauti or Gauda continued to function initially as their capital but was abandoned in 1342 by the Ilyas Shahi sultans in favour of Pandua because of major disturbances along the river course of the Ganga." "Pandua then lay on the banks of the Mahananda, which was the major waterway of the sultanate at the time. However, when the Mahananda too began to veer away from the site of Pandua in the mid-15th century, Gauda was rebuilt and restored to the status of capital city by the Hussain Shahi sultans"... With the ascent of Akbar to the Mughal throne at Delhi... the Mughals annexed the ancient region of Gauda in 1576 and created the Diwani of Bengal. The centre of regional power shifted across the Ganga to Rajmahal. Following the demise of the independent sultanate, the regional importance of the Gauda or Malda region declined irreversibly and the city of Gauda was eventually abandoned.

=== Malda district ===
With the advent of the British, their trading and commercial interests focused on the new cities of Malda and English Bazar. Malda district was formed in 1813 with "some portion of outlying areas of Purnia, Dinajpur and Rajshahi districts". A separate treasury was established in 1832 and a full-fledged Magistrate and Collector was posted in 1859. Malda district was part of Rajshahi Division till 1876, when it was transferred to Bhagalpur Division, and again transferred in 1905 to Rajshahi Division. With the partition of Bengal in 1947, the Radcliffe Line placed Malda district in India, except the Nawabganj subdivision, which was placed in East Pakistan.

== Geography ==
Bhakri, a constituent gram panchayat of Chanchal II block, is located at 25°23′12″N 87°59′32″E.

Chanchal II CD Block is part of the Tal, one of the three physiographic sub-regions of the district. "The Tal region gradually slopes down towards the south-west and merges with the Diara sub-region… (it) is strewn with innumerable marshes, bils and oxbow lakes." The sub-region largely remains submerged during the monsoons and during the dry season large sections of it turn into mud banks with many shallow marshes scattered around. With hardly any gradient the rivers crawl through the region. The Mahananda River flows along the eastern boundary of the CD Block and the district. The Baramasia River forms the western boundary of the CD Block with Harishachndrapur II CD Block.

Chanchal II CD Block is bounded by Chanchal I CD Block on the north, Itahar CD Block of Uttar Dinajpur district on the east, Ratua II and Ratua I CD Blocks on the south and Harishchandrapur II and Harishchandrapur I CD Blocks on the east.

Chanchal II CD Block has an area of 205.22 km^{2}. It has 1 panchayat samity, 7 gram panchayats, 119 gram sansads (village councils), 92 mouzas and 90 inhabited villages. Chanchal police station serves this block. Headquarters of this CD Block is at Malatipur.

Gram panchayats of Chanchal II block/panchayat samiti are: Bhakri, Malatipur, Gourhand, Chandrapara, Jalalpur, Kshempur and Dhangara Bisanpur.

== Demographics ==
=== Population ===
As per 2011 Census of India, Chanchal II CD Block had a total population of 205,333, all of which were rural. There were 105,374 (51%) males and 99,959 (49%) females. Population below 6 years was 32,589. Scheduled Castes numbered 17,112 (8.33%) and Scheduled Tribes numbered 13,786 (6.71%).

Large villages (with 4,000+ population) in Chanchal II CD Block were (2011 population in brackets): Bhakri (4,502), Elangi (5,704), Laliabari (8,143), Kashimpur (10,069), Shripur (4,968), Kandaran (5,634), Chandua (4,038), Damalpur (6,161), Hazaratpur (9,248), Jalalpur (5,600), Goalpara (5,711) and Khanpur (6,920).

Other villages in Chanchal II CD Block included (2011 population in brackets): Chandrapara (2,279), Malatipur (1,209), Kshempur (806) and Gourhanda (3,857).

Decadal Population Growth Rate (%)

View source data.

Note: The CD Block data for 1971-1981, 1981-1991 and 1991-2001 is for both Chanchal I & II taken together

The decadal growth of population in Chanchal II CD Block in 2001–2011 was 24.30%. The decadal growth of population in Kharba PS or Chachal I & II CD Blocks taken together in 1991–2001 was 22.98%. The decadal growth of population in Kharba PS or Chanchal I &II CD Blocks taken together in 1981–1991 was 26.75% and in 1971–1981 was 22.39%. The decadal growth rate of population in Malda district was as follows: 30.33% in 1951–1961, 31.98% in 1961–1971, 26.00% in 1971–1981, 29.78% in 1981–1991, 24.78% in 1991–2001 and 21.22% in 2001–2011. The decadal growth rate for West Bengal in 2001–2011 was 13.93%. The decadal growth rate for West Bengal was 13.93 in 2001–2011, 17.77% in 1991–2001, 24.73% in 1981–1991 and 23.17% in 1971–1981.

Malda district has the second highest decadal population growth rate, for the decade 2001–2011, in West Bengal with a figure of 21.2% which is much higher than the state average (13.8%). Uttar Dinajpur district has the highest decadal growth rate in the state with 23.2%. Decadal growth rate of population is higher than that of neighbouring Murshidabad district, which has the next highest growth rate.

Population density in the district has intensified from 162 persons per km^{2} in 1901 to 881 in 2001 (i.e., around five times), which is highest amongst the districts of North Bengal. However, unlike the densely populated southern regions of West Bengal, urbanisation remains low in Malda district. North Bengal in general, and Malda in particular, has been witness to large scale population movement from other states in India and other districts of West Bengal, as well as from outside the country. The District Human Development Report for Malda notes, "Malda district has been a principal recipient of the human migration waves of the 20th century."

There are reports of Bangladeshi infiltrators coming through the international border. Only a small portion of the border with Bangladesh has been fenced and it is popularly referred to as a porous border.

=== Literacy ===
As per the 2011 census, the total number of literates in Chanchal II CD Block was 99,129 (57.38% of the population over 6 years) out of which males numbered 53,185 (59.97% of the male population over 6 years) and females numbered 45,944 (54.66% of the female population over 6 years). The gender disparity (the difference between female and male literacy rates) was 5.31%.

See also – List of West Bengal districts ranked by literacy rate

Literacy in CD blocks of
Malda district
Malda Sadar subdivision
Gazole – 63.07%
Bamangola – 68.09%
Habibpur – 58.81%
Old Malda – 59.61%
English Bazar – 63.03%
Manikchak – 57.77%
Kaliachak I – 65.25%
Kaliachak II – 64.89%
Kaliachak III – 54.16%
Chanchal subdivision
Harishchandrapur I – 52.47%
Harishchandrapur II – 54.34%
Chanchal I – 65.09%
Chanchal II – 57.38%
Ratua I – 60.13%
Ratua II – 56.19%
Source: 2011 Census: CD Block Wise
Primary Census Abstract Data

=== Language and religion ===
Religion in Chanchal II CD block (2011)
Islam	71.25%
Hinduism	27.82%
Sarnaism	0.73%
Other or not stated	0.20%

As per 2014 District Statistical Handbook: Malda (quoting census figures), in the 2001 census, Muslims numbered 114,782 and formed 69.48% of the population in Chanchal II CD Block. Hindus numbered 48,626 and formed 29.44% of the population. Christians numbered 98 and formed 0.06% of the population. Others numbered 1,686 and formed 1.02% of the population.

Languages in Chanchal II CD block (2011)
1. Bengali (95.8%)
2. Santali (1.84%)
3. Others (2.32%)

At the time of the 2011 census, 95.84% of the population spoke Bengali and 1.84% Santali as their first language.

== Rural poverty ==
As per the Human Development Report for Malda district, published in 2006, the percentage of rural families in BPL category in Chanchal II CD Block was 43.9%. Official surveys of households living in absolute poverty in Malda district have been found to be around 39%.

According to the report, "An overwhelmingly large segment of the rural workforce depends on agriculture as its main source of livelihood, the extent of landlessness in Malda has traditionally been high because of the high densities of human settlement in the district… Although land reforms were implemented in Malda district from the time they were launched in other parts of West Bengal, their progress has been uneven across the Malda blocks… because of the overall paucity of land, the extent of ceiling-surplus land available for redistribution has never been large… The high levels of rural poverty that exist in nearly all blocks in Malda district closely reflect the livelihood crisis… "

== Economy ==
=== Livelihood ===
Livelihood
in Chanchal II CD Block
1. Cultivators (23.4%)
2. Agricultural labourers (54.9%)
3. Household industries (3.12%)
4. Other Workers (18.5%)

In Chanchal II CD Block in 2011, amongst the class of total workers, cultivators numbered 16,531 and formed 23.40%, agricultural labourers numbered 38,816 and formed 54.94%, household industry workers numbered 2,203 and formed 3.12% and other workers numbered 13,096 and formed 18.54%. Total workers numbered 70,646 and formed 34.41% of the total population, and non-workers numbered 134,687 and formed 65.59% of the population.

Note: In the census records a person is considered a cultivator, if the person is engaged in cultivation/ supervision of land owned by self/government/institution. When a person who works on another person’s land for wages in cash or kind or share, is regarded as an agricultural labourer. Household industry is defined as an industry conducted by one or more members of the family within the household or village, and one that does not qualify for registration as a factory under the Factories Act. Other workers are persons engaged in some economic activity other than cultivators, agricultural labourers and household workers. It includes factory, mining, plantation, transport and office workers, those engaged in business and commerce, teachers, entertainment artistes and so on.

=== Infrastructure ===
There are 90 inhabited villages in Chanchal II CD Block. All 90 villages (100%) have power supply. 89 villages (98.89%) have drinking water supply. 17 villages (18.89%) have post offices. 71 villages (78.89%) have telephones (including landlines, public call offices and mobile phones). 55 villages (61.11%) have a pucca (paved) approach road and 22 villages (24.44%) have transport communication (includes bus service, rail facility and navigable waterways). 7 villages (7.78%) have agricultural credit societies. 5 villages (5.56%) have banks.

=== Agriculture ===
"Because of its alluvial soils and the abundance of rivers, large and small, Malda has been an important agricultural region since antiquity, leading to dense human settlement within the boundaries of the district. Rice yields have traditionally been high, making it the breadbasket of North Bengal. But the shifting of rivers and overall ecological change have left an inevitable stamp on the present patterns of human settlement, as a consequence of which settlement densities vary considerably across the district… Agricultural land in the Tal and Diara is mostly irrigated and intensively cropped and cultivated… Rainfall in the district is moderate…"

Chanchal II CD Block had 89 fertiliser depots, 2 seed stores and 39 fair price shops in 2013-14.

In 2013-14, Chanchal II CD Block produced 4,369 tonnes of Aman paddy, the main winter crop from 1,643 hectares, 26,222 tonnes of Boro paddy (spring crop) from 6,910 hectares, 25 tonnes of Aus paddy (summer crop) from 13 hectares, 12,212 tonnes of wheat from 3,533 hectares, 95 tonnes of maize from 25 hectares, 44,430 tonnes of jute from 2,390 hectares, 8,536 tonnes of potatoes from 278 hectares and 409 tonnes of sugar cane from 4 hectares. It also produced pulses and oilseeds .

In 2013-14, the total area irrigated in Chanchal II CD Block was 9,888 hectares, out of which 399 hectares were irrigated by river lift irrigation, 608 hectares by deep tube wells, 6,646 hectares by shallow tube wells and 2,235 hectares by other means.

=== Backward Regions Grant Fund ===
Malda district is listed as a backward region and receives financial support from the Backward Regions Grant Fund. The fund, created by the Government of India, is designed to redress regional imbalances in development. As of 2012, 272 districts across the country were listed under this scheme. The list includes 11 districts of West Bengal.

== Transport ==
In 2013–2014, Chanchal II CD Block had three ferry services and one originating/terminating bus route.

Malahar is a station on the Howrah–New Jalpaiguri line.

== Education ==
In 2013-14, Chanchal II CD Block had 86 primary schools with 19,963 students, 6 middle school with 1,133 students, 11 high schools with 15,527 students and 9 higher secondary schools with 13,288 students. Chanchal II CD Block had 291 institutions for special and non-formal education with 18,217 students.

As per the 2011 census, in Chanchal II CD Block, amongst the 90 inhabited villages, 11 villages did not have a school, 44 villages had more than 1 primary school, 35 villages had at least 1 primary and 1 middle school and 20 villages had at least 1 middle and 1 secondary school.

== Healthcare ==
In 2014, Chanchal II CD Block had 1 rural hospital and 2 primary health centres, with total 40 beds and 7 doctors (excluding private bodies). It had 25 family welfare subcentres. 8,724 patients were treated indoor and 211,544 patients were treated outdoor in the hospitals, health centres and subcentres of the CD Block.

Malatipur Rural Hospital at Malatipur (with 30 beds) is the main medical facility in Chanchal II CD Block. There are primary health centres at Chandrapara (with 4 beds) and Chorolmoni (Khempur PHC) (with 10 beds).
