= Ratua II =

- Community development block
- Interactive map of Ratua II
- Coordinates: 25.1346610°N 88.0363770°E
- Country: India
- State: West Bengal
- District: Malda

Government
  - Type: Representative democracy

Area
  - Total: 101.29 km^{2} (39.11 sq mi)

Population (2011)
  - Total: 202,080
  - Density: 1,995.1/km^{2} (5,167.2/sq mi)

Languages
  - Official: Bengali, English
- Time zone: UTC+5:30 (IST)
- PIN: 731213
- STD/telephone code: 03512
- Lok Sabha constituency: Maldaha Uttar
- Vidhan Sabha constituency: Ratua, Malatipur
- Website: malda.nic.in

Ratua II is a Community Development Block that forms an administrative division in Chanchal subdivision of Malda district in the Indian state of West Bengal.

== History ==
=== Gauda and Pandua ===
Gauda was once the "capital of the ancient bhukti or political division of Bengal known as Pundravardhana which lay on the eastern extremity of the Gupta Empire." During the rule of the Sena Dynasty, in the 11th-12th century, Gauda was rebuilt and extended as Lakshmanawati (later Lakhnauti), and it became the hub of the Sena empire. Gauda was conquered by Muhammad bin Bakhtiyar Khalji in 1205. During the Turko-Afghan period, "the city of Lakhnauti or Gauda continued to function initially as their capital but was abandoned in 1342 by the Ilyas Shahi sultans in favour of Pandua because of major disturbances along the river course of the Ganga." "Pandua then lay on the banks of the Mahananda, which was the major waterway of the sultanate at the time. However, when the Mahananda too began to veer away from the site of Pandua in the mid-15th century, Gauda was rebuilt and restored to the status of capital city by the Hussain Shahi sultans"... With the ascent of Akbar to the Mughal throne at Delhi... the Mughals annexed the ancient region of Gauda in 1576 and created the Diwani of Bengal. The centre of regional power shifted across the Ganga to Rajmahal. Following the demise of the independent sultanate, the regional importance of the Gauda or Malda region declined irreversibly and the city of Gauda was eventually abandoned.

=== Malda district ===
With the advent of the British, their trading and commercial interests focussed on the new cities of Malda and English Bazar. Malda district was formed in 1813 with "some portion of outlying areas of Purnia, Dinajpur and Rajshahi districts". A separate treasury was established in 1832 and a full-fledged Magistrate and Collector was posted in 1859. Malda district was part of Rajshahi Division till 1876, when it was transferred to Bhagalpur Division, and again transferred in 1905 to Rajshahi Division. With the partition of Bengal in 1947, the Radcliffe Line placed Malda district in India, except the Nawabganj subdivision, which was placed in East Pakistan.

== Geography ==
Pukhuria is located at 25°08′05″N 88°02′11″E. Ratua II CD Block is part of the Tal, one of the three physiographic sub-regions of the district. "The Tal region gradually slopes down towards the south-west and merges with the Diara sub-region… (it) is strewn with innumerable marshes, bils and oxbow lakes." The sub-region largely remains submerged during the monsoons and during the dry season large sections of it turn into mud banks with many shallow marshes scattered around. With hardly any gradient the rivers crawl through the region. The Mahananda River forms the eastern boundary of the CD Block, the Mara Mahandnda River flows through the CD Block and the Kalindri River flows along the southern edges of the CD Block.

Ratua II is bounded by Chanchal II CD Block on the north, Itahar CD Block of Uttar Dinajpur district covers a small stretch in the north east, Gazole CD Block and Old Malda CD Block on the east, English Bazar CD Block on the south and Manikchak CD Block and Ratua I CD Block on the west.

Ratua II CD Block has an area of 101.29 km^{2} (39.11 sq mi). It has 1 panchayat samity, 8 gram panchayats, 124 gram sansads (village councils), 51 mouzas and 48 inhabited villages. Pukhuria police station serves this block. Headquarters of this CD Block is at Pukhuria.

Left bank erosion of the Ganges upstream of the Farakka Barrage has rendered nearly 4.5 lakh people homeless in Manikchak, Kaliachak I, II and III and Ratua blocks over the last three decades of the past century. The worst hit area is between Bhutnidiara and Panchanandapore in Kaliachak II block. According to the Ganga Bhangan Pratirodh Action Nagarik Committee 750 km^{2} area was lost in 30 years in the Manikchak and Kalichak areas.

See also - River bank erosion along the Ganges in Malda and Murshidabad districts

Gram panchayats of Ratua II block/ panchayat samiti are: Sripur I, Sripur II, Maharajpur, Sambalpur, Paranpur, Araidanga, Pukhuria and Pirganj.

== Demographics ==
=== Population ===
As per 2011 Census of India, Ratua II CD Block had a total population of 202,080, all of which were rural. There were 102,962 (51%) males and 99.118 (49%) females. Population below 6 years was 31,373. Scheduled Castes numbered 12,880 (6.37%) and Scheduled Tribes numbered 1,954 (0.97%).

Large villages (with 4,000+ population) in Ratua II CD Block were (2011 population in brackets): Laskarpur (4,043), Magura (4,561), Magura Khod (5,844), Barail (7,031), Sambalpur (9,250), Kumarganj (6,131), Raninagar (6,422), Maharajpur (8,978), Rajapur (6,143), Rangamatia (4,858), Shibnagar (8,298), Kadamtali (6,323), Nijgan Paranpur (8,523), Chandpur (6,183), Naoda (5,017), Nij Ganaraidanga (4,765), Betahaek Barna (4,335), Sultanpur (6,778), Koklamari (5,923), Pukhuria (22,550), Nasipur (6,404) and Satmara (5,224).

Other villages in Ratua II CD Block included (2011 population in brackets): Shripur (2,687).

Decadal Population Growth Rate (%)

Note: The CD Block data for 1971–81, 1981–91 and 1991–2001 is for both Ratua I & II taken together.

The decadal growth of population in Ratua II CD Block in 2001–11 was 25.59%. The decadal growth of population in Ratua PS or Ratua I & II CD Blocks taken together in 1991-2001 was 26.33%. The decadal growth of population in Ratua PS or Ratua I &II CD Blocks taken together in 1981-91 was 24.14% and in 1971-81 was 23.59%. The decadal growth rate of population in Malda district was as follows: 30.33% in 1951-61, 31.98% in 1961-71, 26.00% in 1971-81, 29.78% in 1981-91, 24.78% in 1991-2001 and 21.22% in 2001-11. The decadal growth rate for West Bengal in 2001–11 was 13.93%. The decadal growth rate for West Bengal was 13.93 in 2001-2011, 17.77% in 1991-2001. 24.73% in 1981-1991 and 23.17% in 1971-1981.

Malda district has the second highest decadal population growth rate, for the decade 2001-2011, in West Bengal with a figure of 21.2% which is much higher than the state average (13.8%). Uttar Dinajpur district has the highest decadal growth rate in the state with 23.2%. Decadal growth rate of population is higher than that of neighbouring Murshidabad district, which has the next highest growth rate.

Population density in the district has intensified from 162 persons per km^{2} in 1901 to 881 in 2001 (approximately five times), which is highest amongst the districts of North Bengal. However, unlike the densely populated southern regions of West Bengal, urbanisation remains low in Malda district. North Bengal in general, and Malda in particular, has been witness to large scale population movement from other states in India and other districts of West Bengal, as well as from outside the country. The District Human Development Report for Malda notes, "Malda district has been a principal recipient of the human migration waves of the 20th century."

There are reports of Bangladeshi infiltrators coming through the international border. Only a small portion of the border with Bangladesh has been fenced and it is popularly referred to as a porous border.

=== Literacy ===
As per the 2011 census, the total number of literates in Ratua II CD Block was 95,915 (56.19% of the population over 6 years) out of which males numbered 50,738 (58.31% of the male population over six years old) and females numbered 45,177 (54.03% of the female population over six years old). The gender disparity was 4.28%.

See also – List of West Bengal districts ranked by literacy rate

Literacy in CD blocks of
Malda district
Malda Sadar subdivision
Gazole – 63.07%
Bamangola – 68.09%
Habibpur – 58.81%
Old Malda – 59.61%
English Bazar – 63.03%
Manikchak – 57.77%
Kaliachak I – 65.25%
Kaliachak II – 64.89%
Kaliachak III – 54.16%
Chanchal subdivision
Harishchandrapur I – 52.47%
Harishchandrapur II – 54.34%
Chanchal I – 65.09%
Chanchal II – 57.38%
Ratua I – 60.13%
Ratua II – 56.19%
Source: 2011 Census: CD Block Wise
Primary Census Abstract Data

=== Language and religion ===
Religion in Ratua II CD block (2011)
Islam	78.71%
Hinduism	21.18%
Other or not stated	0.11%

Islam is the majority religion, with 78.71% of the population. Hinduism is the second-largest religion.

As per 2014 District Statistical Handbook: Malda (quoting census figures), in the 2001 census, Muslims numbered 123,342 and formed 76.66% of the population in Ratua II CD Block. Hindus numbered 37,454 and formed 23.28% of the population. Christians numbered 3. Others numbered 105 and formed 0.07% of the population.

Languages of Ratua II CD block (2011)
1. Bengali (97.1%)
2. Khotta (2.23%)
3. Others (0.69%)

At the time of the 2011 census, 97.08% of the population spoke Bengali and 2.23% Khotta as their first language.

== Rural poverty ==
As per the Human Development Report for Malda district, published in 2006, the percentage of rural families in BPL category in Ratua II CD Block was 38.4%. Official surveys have found households living in absolute poverty in Malda district to be around 39%.

According to the report, "An overwhelmingly large segment of the rural workforce depends on agriculture as its main source of livelihood, the extent of landlessness in Malda has traditionally been high because of the high densities of human settlement in the district… Although land reforms were implemented in Malda district from the time they were launched in other parts of West Bengal, their progress has been uneven across the Malda blocks… because of the overall paucity of land, the extent of ceiling-surplus land available for redistribution has never been large… The high levels of rural poverty that exist in nearly all blocks in Malda district closely reflect the livelihood crisis… "

== Economy ==
=== Livelihood ===
Livelihood
in Ratua II CD Block
1. Cultivators (17.6%)
2. Agricultural labourers (47.3%)
3. Household industries (5.30%)
4. Other workers (29.7%)

In Ratua II CD Block in 2011, amongst the class of total workers, cultivators numbered 10,792 and formed 17.64%, agricultural labourers numbered 28,954 and formed 47.33%, household industry workers numbered 3,244 and formed 5.30% and other workers numbered 18,179 and formed 29.72%. Total workers numbered 61,169 and formed 30.27% of the total population, and non-workers numbered 140,911 and formed 69.73% of the population.

Note: In the census records a person is considered a cultivator, if the person is engaged in cultivation/ supervision of land owned by self/government/institution. When a person who works on another person's land for wages in cash or kind or share, is regarded as an agricultural labourer. Household industry is defined as an industry conducted by one or more members of the family within the household or village, and one that does not qualify for registration as a factory under the Factories Act. Other workers are persons engaged in some economic activity other than cultivators, agricultural labourers and household workers. It includes factory, mining, plantation, transport and office workers, those engaged in business and commerce, teachers, entertainment artistes and so on.

=== Infrastructure ===
There are 48 inhabited villages in Ratua II CD Block. All 48 villages (100%) have power supply. All 48 villages (100%) have drinking water supply. 19 villages (39.58%) have post offices. 46 villages (96.83%) have telephones (including landlines, public call offices and mobile phones). 35 villages (75.92%) have a pucca approach road and 29 villages (60.42%) have transport communication (includes bus service, rail facility and navigable waterways). 5 villages (10.42%) have banks.

=== Agriculture ===
"Because of its alluvial soils and the abundance of rivers, large and small, Malda has been an important agricultural region since antiquity, leading to dense human settlement within the boundaries of the district. Rice yields have traditionally been high, making it the breadbasket of North Bengal. But the shifting of rivers and overall ecological change have left an inevitable stamp on the present patterns of human settlement, as a consequence of which settlement densities vary considerably across the district… Agricultural land in the Tal and Diara is mostly irrigated and intensively cropped and cultivated… Rainfall in the district is moderate…"

Ratua II CD Block had 125 fertiliser depots, 12 seed stores and 38 fair price shops in 2013-14.

In 2013-14, Ratua II CD Block produced 19,322 tonnes of Aman paddy, the main winter crop from 5,960 hectares, 18,139 tonnes of Boro paddy (spring crop) from 5,593 hectares, 52 tonnes of Aus paddy (summer crop) from 27 hectares, 7,386 tonnes of wheat from 2,530 hectares, 2,382 tonnes of maize from 691 hectares, 55,209 tonnes of jute from 3,057 hectares, 2,514 tonnes of potatoes from 74 hectares and 4,402 tonnes of sugar cane from 43 hectares. It also produced pulses and oilseeds.

In 2013-14, the total area irrigated in Ratua II CD Block was 9,452 hectares, out of which 1,431 hectares were irrigated by river lift irrigation, 1,240 hectares by deep tube wells, 3,828 hectares by shallow tube wells and 2,953 hectares by other means.

=== Mango ===
25,500 hectares of land in Malda district produces mango varieties such as langra, himasagar, amrapali, laxmanbhog, gopalbhog and fazli. The core area of mango production is Old Malda, English Bazar and Manikchak CD Blocks, from where it has spread to Kaliachak I & II, Ratua I & II and Chanchal I CD Blocks.

=== Backward Regions Grant Fund ===
Malda district is listed as a backward region and receives financial support from the Backward Regions Grant Fund. The fund, created by the Government of India, is designed to redress regional imbalances in development. As of 2012, 272 districts across the country were listed under this scheme. The list includes 11 districts of West Bengal.

== Transport ==
In 2013-14, Ratua II CD Block had 3 ferry services and 3 originating/ terminating bus routes. The nearest railway station is 12 km from the CD Block headquarters.

Kumarganj and Sripur Halt are railway stations on the Malda-Raiganj section, within the block.

== Education ==
In 2013-14, Ratua II CD Block had 85 primary schools with 19,292 students, 7 middle school with 1,398 students, 6 high schools with 8,786 students and 15 higher secondary schools with 28,483 students. Ratua II CD Block had 255 institutions for special and non-formal education with 15,226 students.

As per the 2011 census, in Ratua II CD Block, amongst the 48 inhabited villages, all villages had at least 1 school, 16 villages had more than 1 primary school, 32 villages had at least 1 primary and 1 middle school and 22 villages had at least 1 middle and 1 secondary school.

== Healthcare ==
In 2014, Ratua II CD Block had 1 block primary health centre and 2 primary health centres, with total 40 beds and 10 doctors (excluding private bodies). It had 25 family welfare subcentres. 8,661 patients were treated indoor and 155,153 patients were treated outdoor in the hospitals, health centres and subcentres of the CD Block.

Araidanga Rural Hospital at Araidanga (with 30 beds) is the main medical facility in Ratua II CD Block. There are primary health centres at Khailsona (Sultanganj PHC) (with 6 beds) and Kumarganj (with 10 beds).

== See also ==
- Araidanga (Vidhan Sabha constituency)
