= Chanchal I =

- Community development block
- Interactive map of Chanchal I
- Coordinates: 25.39°N 87.99°E
- Country: India
- State: West Bengal
- District: Malda

Government
  - Type: Representative democracy

Area
  - Total: 162.08 km^{2} (62.58 sq mi)

Population (2011)
  - Total: 204,740
  - Density: 1,263.2/km^{2} (3,271.7/sq mi)

Languages
  - Official: Bengali, English
- Time zone: UTC+5:30 (IST)
- PIN: 732123
- STD/telephone code: 03513
- Lok Sabha constituency: Maldaha Uttar
- Vidhan Sabha constituency: Chanchal
- Website: malda.nic.in

Chanchal I is a community development block that forms an administrative division in Chanchal subdivision of Malda district in the Indian state of West Bengal.

== History ==
=== Gauda and Pandua ===
Gauda was once the "capital of the ancient bhukti or political division of Bengal known as Pundravardhana which lay on the eastern extremity of the Gupta Empire." During the rule of the Sena Dynasty, in the 11th-12th century, Gauda was rebuilt and extended as Lakshmanawati (later Lakhnauti), and it became the hub of the Sena empire. Gauda was conquered by Muhammad bin Bakhtiyar Khalji in 1205. During the Turko-Afghan period, "the city of Lakhnauti or Gauda continued to function initially as their capital but was abandoned in 1342 by the Ilyas Shahi sultans in favour of Pandua because of major disturbances along the river course of the Ganga."

"Pandua then lay on the banks of the Mahananda, which was the major waterway of the sultanate at the time. However, when the Mahananda too began to veer away from the site of Pandua in the mid-15th century, Gauda was rebuilt and restored to the status of capital city by the Hussain Shahi sultans"... With the ascent of Akbar to the Mughal throne at Delhi... the Mughals annexed the ancient region of Gauda in 1576 and created the Diwani of Bengal. The centre of regional power shifted across the Ganga to Rajmahal. Following the demise of the independent sultanate, the regional importance of the Gauda or Malda region declined irreversibly and the city of Gauda was eventually abandoned.

=== Malda district ===
With the advent of the British, their trading and commercial interests focussed on the new cities of Malda and English Bazar. Malda district was formed in 1813 with "some portion of outlying areas of Purnia, Dinajpur and Rajshahi districts". A separate treasury was established in 1832 and a full-fledged Magistrate and Collector was posted in 1859. Malda district was part of Rajshahi Division till 1876, when it was transferred to Bhagalpur Division, and again transferred in 1905 to Rajshahi Division. With the partition of Bengal in 1947, the Radcliffe Line placed Malda district in India, except the Nawabganj subdivision, which was placed in East Pakistan.

== Geography ==
Chanchal is located at 25°23′N 87°59′E.

Chanchal I CD Block is part of the Tal, one of the three physiographic sub-regions of the district. "The Tal region gradually slopes down towards the south-west and merges with the Diara sub-region… (it) is strewn with innumerable marshes, bils and oxbow lakes." The sub-region largely remains submerged during the monsoons and during the dry season large sections of it turn into mud banks with many shallow marshes scattered around. With hardly any gradient the rivers crawl through the region. The Mahananda River flows along the northern and a major portion of the eastern boundary of the CD Block. The Baramasia River forms the western boundary of the CD Block with Harishachndrapur I CD Block.

Chanchal I CD Block is bounded by Barsoi CD Block of Katihar district in Bihar on the north, Itahar CD Block of Uttar Dinajpur district on the east, Chanchal II CD Block on the south and Harishchandrapur I CD Block on the west.

Chanchal I CD Block has an area of 162.08 km^{2}. It has 1 panchayat samity, 8 gram panchayats, 135 gram sansads (village councils), 101 mouzas and 98 inhabited villages. Chanchal police station serves this block. Headquarters of this CD Block is at Chanchal.

Gram panchayats of Chanchal I block/ panchayat samiti are: Mahanandapur, Bhagabanpur, Makdampur, Kharba, Chanchal, Kaligram, Alihanda and Motiharpur.

== Demographics ==
=== Population ===
As per 2011 Census of India, Chanchal I CD Block had a total population of 204,740, of which 119,170 were rural and 5,570 were urban. There were 105,014 (51%) males and 99,726 (49%) females. Population below 6 years was 26,904. Scheduled Castes numbered 27,370 (13.37%) and Scheduled Tribes numbered 869 (0.42%).

The only census town in Chanchal I CD Block was (2011 population in brackets): Chanchal (5,570).

Large villages (with 4,000+ population) in Chanchal I CD Block were (2011 population in brackets): Swarupganj (4,368), Paschim Bhagabanpur (4,993), Gauria (4,236), Bhagabatipur (4,444), Nabagram (7,170), Hatinda (6,177), Singia (12,003) and Kaligram (8,897).

Other villages in Chanchal I CD Block included (2011 population in brackets): Alihanda (960), Kharba (3,744) and Mahananadapur (3,311).

Decadal Population Growth Rate (%)

Note: The CD Block data for 1971–1981, 1981-1991 and 1991-2001 is for both Chanchal I & II taken together

The decadal growth of population in Chanchal I CD Block in 2001-2011 was 17.53%. The decadal growth of population in Kharba PS orChachal I & II CD Blocks taken together in 1991-2001 was 22.98%. The decadal growth of population in Kharba PS or Chanchal I &II CD Blocks taken together in 1981-91 was 26.75% and in 1971-81 was 22.39%. The decadal growth rate of population in Malda district was as follows: 30.33% in 1951–61, 31.98% in 1961–71, 26.00% in 1971–81, 29.78% in 1981–91, 24.78% in 1991-2001 and 21.22% in 2001–11. The decadal growth rate for West Bengal in 2001-11 was 13.93%. The decadal growth rate for West Bengal was 13.93 in 2001–2011, 17.77% in 1991–2001. 24.73% in 1981-1991 and 23.17% in 1971–1981.

Malda district has the second highest decadal population growth rate, for the decade 2001–2011, in West Bengal with a figure of 21.2% which is much higher than the state average (13.8%). Uttar Dinajpur district has the highest decadal growth rate in the state with 23.2%. Decadal growth rate of population is higher than that of neighbouring Murshidabad district, which has the next highest growth rate.

Population density in the district has intensified from 162 persons per km^{2} in 1901 to 881 in 2001 (i.e., around five times), which is highest amongst the districts of North Bengal. However, unlike the densely populated southern regions of West Bengal, urbanisation remains low in Malda district. North Bengal in general, and Malda in particular, has been witness to large scale population movement from other states in India and other districts of West Bengal, as well as from outside the country. The District Human Development Report for Malda notes, "Malda district has been a principal recipient of the human migration waves of the 20th century."

There are reports of Bangladeshi infiltrators coming through the international border. Only a small portion of the border with Bangladesh has been fenced and it is popularly referred to as a porous border.

=== Literacy ===
As per the 2011 census, the total number of literates in Chanchal I CD Block was 115,746 (65.09% of the population over 6 years) out of which males numbered 62,693 (68.76% of the male population over 6 years) and females numbered 53,053 (61.22% of the female population over 6 years). The gender disparity (the difference between female and male literacy rates) was 7.55%.

See also – List of West Bengal districts ranked by literacy rate

Literacy in CD blocks of
Malda district
Malda Sadar subdivision
Gazole – 63.07%
Bamangola – 68.09%
Habibpur – 58.81%
Old Malda – 59.61%
English Bazar – 63.03%
Manikchak – 57.77%
Kaliachak I – 65.25%
Kaliachak II – 64.89%
Kaliachak III – 54.16%
Chanchal subdivision
Harishchandrapur I – 52.47%
Harishchandrapur II – 54.34%
Chanchal I – 65.09%
Chanchal II – 57.38%
Ratua I – 60.13%
Ratua II – 56.19%
Source: 2011 Census: CD Block Wise
Primary Census Abstract Data

=== Language and religion ===
Religion in Chanchal I CD block (2011)
Islam	71.22%
Hinduism	28.61%
Other or not stated	0.17%

Islam is the majority religion, with 71.22% of the population. Hinduism is the second-largest religion.

As per 2014 District Statistical Handbook: Malda (quoting census figures), in the 2001 census, Muslims numbered 122,055 and formed 70.06% of the population in Chanchal I CD Block. Hindus numbered 51,831 and formed 29.75% of the population. Christians numbered 20 and formed 0.01% of the population. Others numbered 298 and formed 0.18% of the population.

Bengali is the predominant language, spoken by 99.26% of the population.

== Rural poverty ==
As per the Human Development Report for Malda district, published in 2006, the percentage of rural families in BPL category in Chanchal I CD Block was 50.0%. Official surveys of households living in absolute poverty in Malda district have been found to be around 39%.

According to the report, "An overwhelmingly large segment of the rural workforce depends on agriculture as its main source of livelihood, the extent of landlessness in Malda has traditionally been high because of the high densities of human settlement in the district… Although land reforms were implemented in Malda district from the time they were launched in other parts of West Bengal, their progress has been uneven across the Malda blocks… because of the overall paucity of land, the extent of ceiling-surplus land available for redistribution has never been large… The high levels of rural poverty that exist in nearly all blocks in Malda district closely reflect the livelihood crisis… "

== Economy ==
=== Livelihood ===
Livelihood
in Chanchal I CD Block
1. Cultivators (20.6%)
2. Agricultural labourers (53.4%)
3. Household industries (2.55%)
4. Other Workers (23.5%)

In Chanchal I CD Block in 2011, amongst the class of total workers, cultivators numbered 15,994 and formed 20.55%, agricultural labourers numbered 41,532 and formed 53.37%, household industry workers numbered 1,983 and formed 2.55% and other workers numbered 18,317 and formed 23.54%. Total workers numbered 77,826 and formed 38.01% of the total population, and non-workers numbered 126,914 and formed 61.99% of the population.

Note: In the census records a person is considered a cultivator, if the person is engaged in cultivation/ supervision of land owned by self/government/institution. When a person who works on another person's land for wages in cash or kind or share, is regarded as an agricultural labourer. Household industry is defined as an industry conducted by one or more members of the family within the household or village, and one that does not qualify for registration as a factory under the Factories Act. Other workers are persons engaged in some economic activity other than cultivators, agricultural labourers and household workers. It includes factory, mining, plantation, transport and office workers, those engaged in business and commerce, teachers, entertainment artistes and so on.

=== Infrastructure ===
There are 98 inhabited villages in Chanchal I CD Block. All 98 villages (100%) have power supply. All 98 villages (100%) have drinking water supply. 16 villages (16.33%) have post offices. 88 villages (89.80%) have telephones (including landlines, public call offices and mobile phones). 45 villages (45.92%) have a pucca (paved) approach road and 29 villages (29.59%) have transport communication (includes bus service, rail facility and navigable waterways). 6 villages (6.12%) have agricultural credit societies. 8 villages (8.16%) have banks.

=== Agriculture ===
"Because of its alluvial soils and the abundance of rivers, large and small, Malda has been an important agricultural region since antiquity, leading to dense human settlement within the boundaries of the district. Rice yields have traditionally been high, making it the breadbasket of North Bengal. But the shifting of rivers and overall ecological change have left an inevitable stamp on the present patterns of human settlement, as a consequence of which settlement densities vary considerably across the district… Agricultural land in the Tal and Diara is mostly irrigated and intensively cropped and cultivated… Rainfall in the district is moderate…"

Chanchal I CD Block had 89 fertiliser depots, 17 seed stores and 43 fair price shops in 2013–14.

In 2013–14, Chanchal I CD Block produced 35,329 tonnes of Aman paddy, the main winter crop from 11,358 hectares, 26,743 tonnes of Boro paddy (spring crop) from 6,952 hectares, 41 tonnes of Aus paddy (summer crop) from 21 hectares, 6,571 tonnes of wheat from 2,064 hectares, 137 tonnes of maize from 36 hectares, 73,263 tonnes of jute from 4,387 hectares, 3,210 tonnes of potatoes from 174 hectares and 1,945 tonnes of sugar cane from 19 hectares. It also produced pulses and oilseeds .

In 2013–14, the total area irrigated in Chanchal I CD Block was 9,926 hectares, out of which 33 hectares were irrigated by tank irrigation, 419 hectares by river lift irrigation, 686 hectares by deep tube wells, 6,940 hectares by shallow tube wells and 1,848 hectares by other means.

=== Mango ===
25,500 hectares of land in Malda district produces mango varieties such as langra, himasagar, amrapali, laxmanbhog, gopalbhog and fazli. The core area of mango production is Old Malda, English Bazar and Manikchak CD Blocks, from where it has spread to Kaliachak I & II, Ratua I & II and Chanchal I CD Blocks.

=== Backward Regions Grant Fund ===
Malda district is listed as a backward region and receives financial support from the Backward Regions Grant Fund. The fund, created by the Government of India, is designed to redress regional imbalances in development. As of 2012, 272 districts across the country were listed under this scheme. The list includes 11 districts of West Bengal.

== Transport ==
In 2013–14, Chanchal I CD Block had 4 ferry services and 4 originating/ terminating bus routes. The nearest railway station from CD Block headquarters is 13 km.

== Education ==
In 2013–14, Chanchal I CD Block had 102 primary schools with 13,175 students, 14 middle school with 2,060 students, 7 high schools with 9,201 students and 10 higher secondary schools with 18,006 students. Chanchal I CD Block had 1 general degree college with 3,147 students, 1 technical/ professional institution with 100 students and 299 institutions for special and non-formal education with 10,169 students.

As per the 2011 census, in Chanchal I CD Block, amongst the 98 inhabited villages, 13 villages did not have a school, 49 villages had more than 1 primary school, 36 villages had at least 1 primary and 1 middle school and 17 villages had at least 1 middle and 1 secondary school.

== Healthcare ==
In 2014, Chanchal I CD Block had 1 hospital, 2 primary health centres and 1 nursing home with total 131 beds and 11 doctors (excluding private bodies). It had 27 family welfare subcentres. 17,055 patients were treated indoor and 173,783 patients were treated outdoor in the hospitals, health centres and subcentres of the CD Block.

Chanchal subdivisional hospital at Chanchal (with 100 beds) is a major medical facility. There are primary health centres in Chanchal I CD Block at Kharba (with 10 beds) and Singla (Nadishik PHC) (with 10 beds).
