= Chanchal subdivision =

- Subdivision
- Interactive map of Chanchal subdivision
- Coordinates: 25.39°N 87.99°E
- Country: India
- State: West Bengal
- District: Malda
- Headquarters: Chanchal

Languages
  - Official: Bengali, English
- Time zone: UTC+5:30 (IST)
- ISO 3166 code: ISO 3166-2:IN
- Vehicle registration: WB

Chanchal subdivision is an administrative subdivision of the Malda district in the Indian state of West Bengal.

== Geography ==
Chanchal subdivision covers the Tal, one of the three physiographic sub-regions of the district. The Tal region gradually slopes down towards the south-west and merges with the Diara sub-region... (it) is strewn with innumerable marshes, bils and oxbow lakes.”

== Subdivisions ==
Malda district is divided into two administrative subdivisions:

Subdivision	Headquarters	Area km^{2}	Population (2011)	Urban population % (2011)	Rural Population % (2011)
Malda Sadar	English Bazar	2,515.43	2,650,466	20.23	79.77
Chanchal	Chanchal	1,160.44	1,338,379	0.42	88.58
Malda district	English Bazar	3,733.00	3,988,845	13.58	86.42

== Administrative units ==
Chanchal subdivision has 4 police stations, 6 community development blocks, 6 panchayat samitis, 49 gram panchayats, 524 mouzas, 508 inhabited villages and 1 census town. The census town is: Chanchal. The subdivision has its headquarters at Chanchal.

== Police stations ==
Police stations in Chanchal subdivision have the following features and jurisdiction:

Police station	Area covered (km^{2})	Border (km)	Municipal town/ city	CD Block
Harishchandrapur	n/a	-	-	Harishchandrapur I, Harishchandrapur II
Chanchal	n/a	-	-	Chanchal I, Chanchal II
Pukhuria	n/a	-	-	Ratua II
Ratua	n/a	-	-	Ratua I

== Blocks ==
Community development blocks in Chanchal subdivision are:

CD Block	Headquarters	Area km^{2}	Population (2011)	SC %	ST %	Hindus %	Muslims %	Literacy rate %	Census Towns
Harishchandrapur I	Harishchandrapur	171.40	199,493	24.60	2.08	42.10	57.81	52.47	-
Harishchandrapur II	Khanta (Barduari)	217.22	251,345	12.85	2.88	27.24	72.61	54.34	-
Chanchal I	Chanchal	162.08	204,740	13.37	0.42	29.75	70.06	65.09	1
Chanchal II	Malatipur	205.22	205,333	8.33	6.71	29.44	69.48	57.38	-
Ratua I	Ratua	225.17	275,388	11.09	8.52	34.46	65.28	60.13	-
Ratua II	Pukhuria	101.29	202,080	6.37	0.97	23.28	76.66	56.19	-

== Gram panchayats ==
The subdivision contains 49 gram panchayats under 6 community development blocks:

- Chanchal I block consists of eight gram panchayats, viz. Alihanda, Chanchal, Kharba, Makdampur, Bhagabanpur, Kaligram, Mahanandapur and Motiharpur.
- Chanchal II block consists of seven gram panchayats, viz. Bhakri, Dhangara–Bishanpur, Gourhanda, Kshempur, Chandrapara, Jalalpur and Malatipur.
- Ratua I block consists of ten gram panchayats, viz. Baharal, Chandmoni–II, Mahanandatola, Bhado, Bilaimari, Debipur, Ratua, Chandmoni–I, Kahala and Samsi.
- Ratua II block consists of eight gram panchayats, viz. Araidanga, Paranpur, Pukhuria, Sreepur–I, Maharajpur, Peerganj, Sambalpur and Sreepur–II.
- Harishchandrapur I block consists of seven gram panchayats, viz. Bhingole, Harishchandrapur, Kusidha, Rashidabad, Barui, Mahendrapur and Tulsihatta.
- Harishchandrapur II block consists of nine gram panchayats, viz. Daulatpur, Malior–I, Sadlichak, Doulatnagar, Malior–II, Sultannagar, Islampur, Mashaldaha and Valuka.

== Education ==
Malda district had a literacy rate of 61.73% (for population of 7 years and above) as per the census of 2011. Malda Sadar subdivision had a literacy rate of 63.76% and Chanchal subdivision 57.68%.

The table below gives a comprehensive picture of the education scenario in Malda district for the year 2013-14:

Subdivision	Primary School		Middle School		High School		Higher Secondary School		General College, Univ		Technical / Professional Instt		Non-formal Education	
Subdivision	Institution	Student	Institution	Student	Institution	Student	Institution	Student	Institution	Student	Institution	Student	Institution	Student
Malda Sadar	1,334	198,126	116	28,270	74	130,124	143	270,490	8	33,233	20	2,947	4,518	167,244
Chanchal	608	130,248	69	14,113	54	84,638	65	122,173	3	9,846	1	100	1,794	105,051
Malda district	1,942	328,374	185	42,383	128	214,762	208	392,663	11	43,079	21	3,047	6,312	272,295

Note: Primary schools include junior basic schools; middle schools, high schools and higher secondary schools include madrasahs; technical schools include junior technical schools, junior government polytechnics, industrial technical institutes, industrial training centres, nursing training institutes etc.; technical and professional colleges include engineering colleges, medical colleges, para-medical institutes, management colleges, teachers training and nursing training colleges, law colleges, art colleges, music colleges etc. Special and non-formal education centres include sishu siksha kendras, madhyamik siksha kendras, centres of Rabindra mukta vidyalaya, recognised Sanskrit tols, institutions for the blind and other handicapped persons, Anganwadi centres, reformatory schools etc.

=== Educational institutions ===
The following institutions are located in the Chanchal subdivision:

- Samsi College was established at Samsi in 1968.
- Chanchal College was established at Chanchal in 1969.

Niar college

== Healthcare ==
The table below (all data in numbers) presents an overview of the medical facilities available and patients treated in the hospitals, health centres and sub-centres in 2014 in Malda district.

Subdivision	Health & Family Welfare Deptt, WB				Other State Govt Deptts	Local bodies	Central Govt Deptts / PSUs	NGO / Private Nursing Homes	Total	Total Number of Beds	Total Number of Doctors*	Indoor Patients	Outdoor Patients
Subdivision	Hospitals	Rural Hospitals	Block Primary Health Centres	Primary Health Centres	Other State Govt Deptts	Local bodies	Central Govt Deptts / PSUs	NGO / Private Nursing Homes	Total	Total Number of Beds	Total Number of Doctors*	Indoor Patients	Outdoor Patients
Malda Sadar	1	9	1	21	2	1	1	28	70	2,241	321	59,798	1,655,481
Chanchal	1	3	3	13	-	-	-	1	21	411	53	54,733	1,082,292
Malda district	2	12	4	34	2	1	7	29	91	2,652	374	114,531	2,737,773

.* Excluding nursing homes

=== Medical facilities ===
Medical facilities available in Chanchal subdivision are as follows:
Hospitals: (Name, location, beds)
Chanchal Subdivisional Hospital, Chanchal, 100 beds
Rural Hospitals: (Name, block, location, beds)
Harishchandrapur Rural Hospital, Harishchandrapur I CD Block, Harishchandrapur, 65 beds
Ratua Rural Hospital, Ratua I CD Block, Ratua, 30 beds
Araidanga Rural Hospital, Ratua II CD Block, Araidanga, 30 beds
Masaldabazar Rural Hospital, Harishchandrapur II CD Block, Mashaldaha PO Kariali, 30 beds
Malatipur Rural Hospital, Chanchal II, Malatipur, 30 beds
Primary Health Centres: (CD Block-wise)(CD Block, PHC location, beds)
Ratua I CD Block: Debipur (10), Mahanandatola (10), Samsi (10)
Ratua II CD Block: Khailsona (Sultanganj PHC) (6), Kumarganj (10)
Harishchandrapur I CD Block: Vingal (Bhingola PHC) (4), Boroi (6), Khushida (10)
Harishchandrapur II CD Block: Bhaluka Bazar (Bhaluka PHC) (10), Hadamnagar (6)
Chanchal I CD Block: Kharba (10), Singia (Nadishik PHC) (10)
Chanchal II CD Block: Chandrapara (4), Chorolmoni (Khempur PHC) (10)

== Electoral constituencies ==
Lok Sabha (parliamentary) and Vidhan Sabha (state assembly) constituencies in Chanchal subdivision were as follows:

Lok Sabha constituency	Reservation	Vidhan Sabha constituency	Reservation	CD Block and/or Gram panchayats and/or municipal areas
Maldaha Uttar	None	Chanchal	None	Chanchal I CD Block and Barui, Kusidha, Rashidabad and Tulsihatta gram panchayats of Harishchandrapur I CD Block
		Harishchandrapur	None	Harishchandrapur II CD Block and Bhingole, Harishchandrapur and Mahendrapur gram panchayats of Harishchandrapur I CD Block
		Malatipur	None	Harishchandrapur II CD Block and Bhingole, Harishchandrapur and Mahendrapur gram panchayats of Harishchandrapur I CD Block
		Ratua	None	Ratua I CD Block and Araidanga, Paranpur, Pukuria and Sambalpur gram panchayats of Ratua II CD Block
		3 assembly segments in Malda Sadar subdivision		
