= Chanchal =

- Town
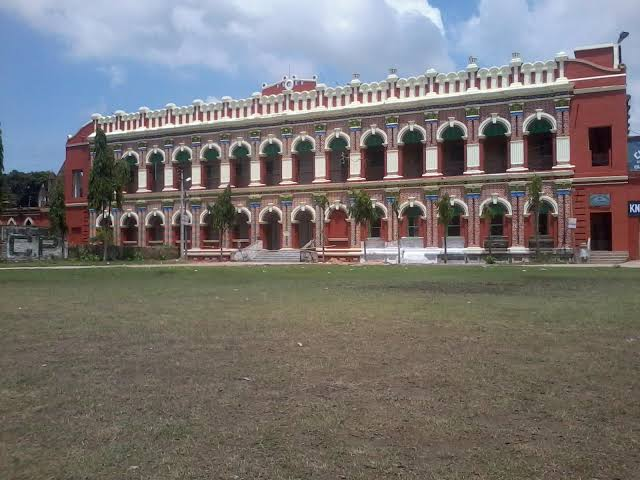
- Chanchal Rajbari

- Location in West Bengal, India Chanchal (India) Chanchal (Asia)
- Coordinates: 25.39°N 87.99°E
- Country: India
- State: West Bengal
- District: Malda

Area
  - Total: 1.7896 km^{2} (0.6910 sq mi)

Population (2011)
  - Total: 5,570
  - Density: 3,110/km^{2} (8,060/sq mi)

Languages
  - Official: Bengali
  - Additional official: English
- Time zone: UTC+5:30 (IST)
- PIN: 732123
- Vehicle registration: WB 83/WB 84
- Lok Sabha constituency: Maldaha Uttar
- Vidhan Sabha constituency: Chanchal
- Website: wb.gov.in

Chanchal is a census town in Malda district in the state of West Bengal, India. It is the headquarters of the Chanchal subdivision.

== Geography ==
Cities, towns and locations in the northern portion of Malda district (including Chanchal subdivision and Old Malda, Habibpur, Bamangola and Gazole CD blocks)
M: municipal town, CT: census town, R: rural/ urban centre, F: Facility, H: historical centre
Owing to space constraints in the small map, the actual locations in a larger map may vary slightly

=== Area overview ===
The area shown in the adjacent map covers two physiographic regions – the Barind in the east and the tal in the west. The eastern part is comparatively high (up to 40 metres above mean sea level at places) and uneven. The soils of the eastern region are “hard salty clays of a reddish hue and the ground is baked hard as iron.” It lies to the east of the Mahananda River. The area lying to the west of the Mahananda River, the tal, is a flat low land and “is strewn with innumerable marshes, bils and oxbow lakes.” The tal area is prone to flooding by local rivers. The total area is overwhelmingly rural. There are two important historical/ archaeological sites in the area – Pandua and Jagjivanpur.

Note: The map alongside presents some of the notable locations in the area. All places marked in the map are linked in the larger full screen map.

=== Location ===
Chanchal is located at 25.39°N 87.99°E. Chanchal is the headquarter of the Chanchal subdivision. Also, the headquarter of the Chanchal–I CD block is here.

There is an announcement that Chanchal and Gazole would be amongst the 22 new municipalities to be formed in West Bengal. The matter has also been reported in the press, but till November 2018, there has been no formal announcement or notification.

=== Climate ===
Chanchal has three distinct seasons: summer, winter and monsoon. In summer the temperature sometimes reaches 45 degree Celsius. Winters are generally chilled and cool and sometimes temperature goes below 3 degree Celsius. During the monsoons (between June and September), the town is lashed by moderate to heavy rains.

== History ==
It was the home of Raja Saratchandra Rai Bahadur, who built the Chanchal palace. The King was married to Queen Dakshyani. One part of the palace was transformed into a government college in 1969.The other part of the Palace is now Chanchal Subdivisional Court.

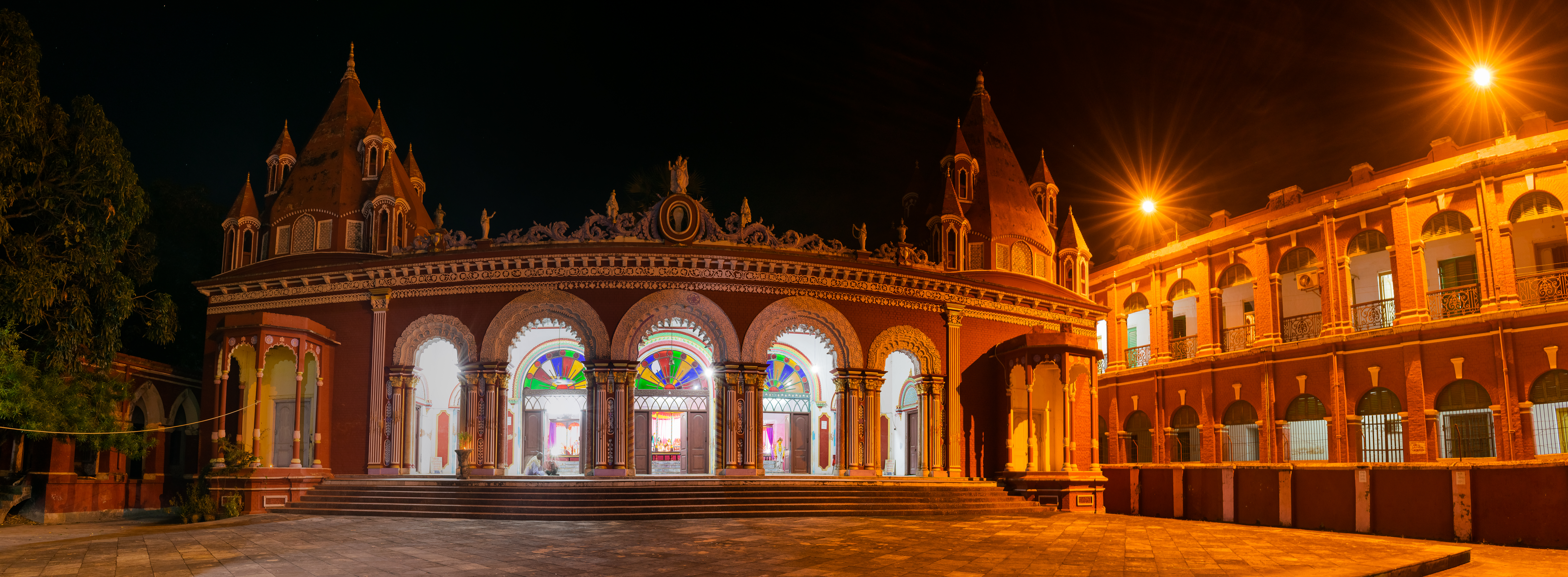
Chanchal Raj Bari

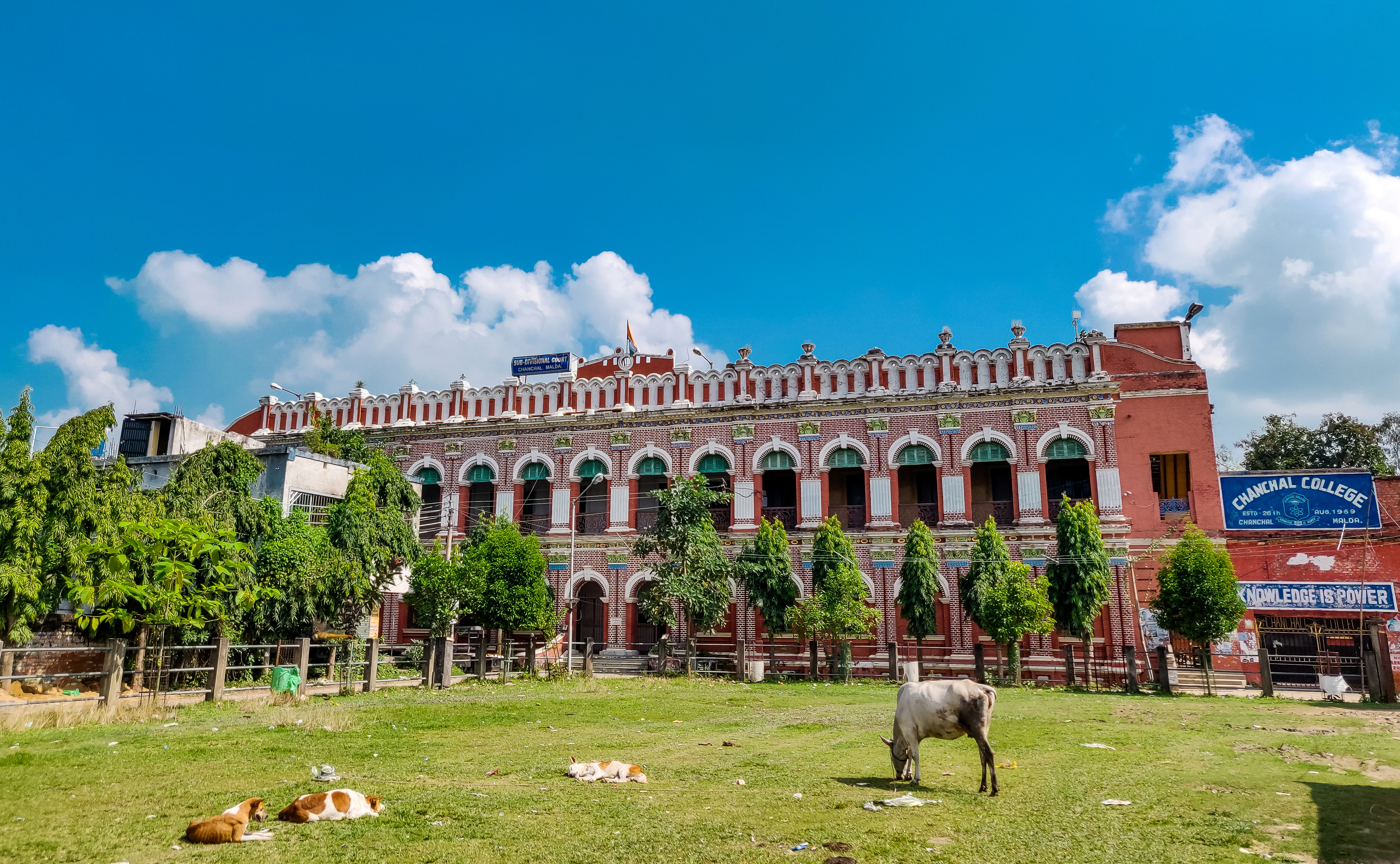
Chanchal Sub-Divisional Court and Chanchal College

== Demographics ==
According to the 2011 Census of India, Chanchal had a total population of 5,570, of which 2,287 (51%) were males and 2,743 (49%) were females. Population in the age range 0–6 years was 634. The total number of literate persons in Chanchal was 4,936 (78.04% of the population over 6 years).

== Infrastructure ==
According to the District Census Handbook, Maldah, 2011, Chanchal covered an area of 1.7896 km^{2}. The protected water-supply involved overhead tank, tube well/ borewell. It had 900 domestic electric connections, 400 road lighting points. Among the medical facilities it had 1 family welfare centre, 1 maternity & child welfare centre. Among the educational facilities, it had 1 primary school, 1 middle school, 1 secondary school, 1 higher secondary school, 1 general degree college. Among the social, cultural and recreational facilities it had 1 cinema theatre, 1 public library.

== Civic administration ==
=== Police station ===
Chanchal police station under West Bengal police has jurisdiction over Chanchal I and Chanchal II CD blocks.

=== CD block HQ ===
The headquarters of Chanchal I CD block is at Chanchal.

== Transport ==
Chanchal is on National Highway 31.

=== Roadways ===
Chanchal is connected by bus services like NBSTC and private buses to cities like Balurghat, Berhampore, Siliguri, Kolkata, Asansol, Raiganj, Malda, Dinhata, Suri, Ranaghat through National Highway 31 (India).

== Education ==
- Chanchal Siddheswari Institution
- Chanchal College

== Healthcare ==
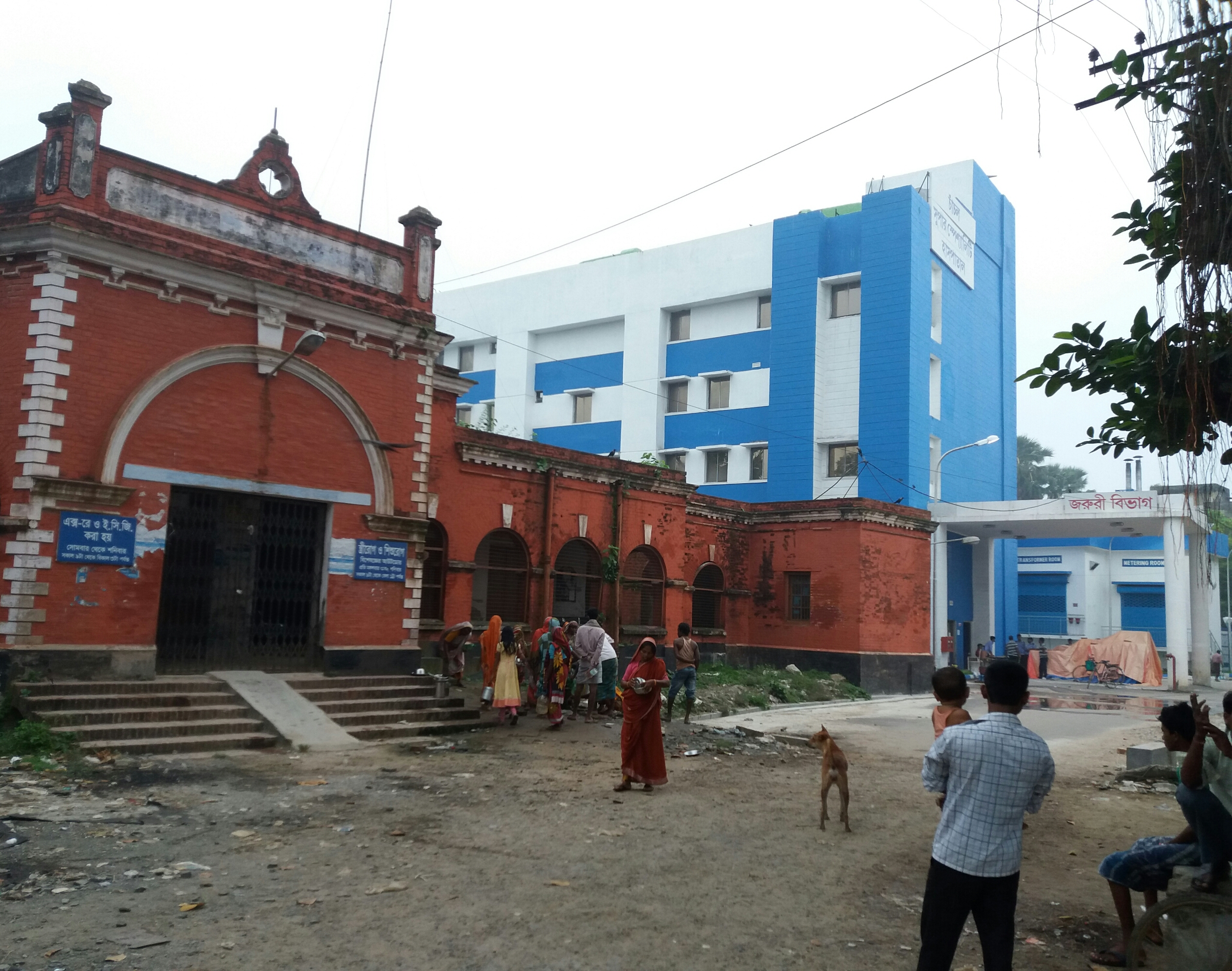
Chanchal Super Speciality Hospital

Chanchal Super Speciality Hospital at Chanchal Roy Para, Chanchal (with blood bank and other digital facilities) is a major medical facility. There are primary health centres in Chanchal I CD Block at Kharba (with 10 beds) and Singia (Nadishik PHC) (with 10 beds).

== Notable people ==
- Shibram Chakraborty
