= Kaligram =

- village
- Location in West Bengal, India
- Coordinates: 25°23′31″N 88°02′00″E
- Country: India
- State: West Bengal
- District: Malda

Government
  - Type: Panchayati Raj

Population
  - Total: 8,897 (2,011 census)

Languages
  - Official: Bengali, English
- Time zone: UTC+5:30 (IST)
- PIN: 732126
- Telephone code: 913513
- ISO 3166 code: IN-WB
- Vehicle registration: WB
- Nearest city: English Bazar
- Sex ratio: 4540 : 4357 (2011 census) ♂/♀
- Lok Sabha constituency: Maldaha Uttar (Lok Sabha constituency)
- Vidhan Sabha constituency: Chanchal (Vidhan Sabha constituency)
- Website: malda.nic.in

Kaligram is a second largest village in Chanchal-I Block of District Malda in the state of West Bengal, India. It is under Kaligram-Gram-Panchayat of The Block Chanchal-I of the district Malda. It falls under the jurisdiction of Chanchal police station. It dates back to Mughal Era. It is widely believed that a commander of Goud saltanate named Kali Khan fled Goud when Sher-Sah- suri attacked Goud in 1538 and came to this village and it was named after him. In the history of Bengal it was mentioned that Raja Ganesha fled from his capital by using the Kadali River in his way to Dinajpur. Kadla, named after the extinct river is in Kaligram.

The climate is rather extreme hot and sultry during summer season, with plentiful rains and moisture in the air throughout the year. There are four seasons in the year. The cold season starts about the middle of November and continues till the end of February. The period from March to May is the summer season. The rainy season starts in June with the coming of south-west monsoons and continues until the middle of September. October and the first half of November constitutes the post monsoons season. The maximum precipitation occurs during the period from June to September.

Kaligram is located at 25.383425°N 88.045163°E under Chanchal subdivision. Abhijnan
