= Samsi College =

College in West Bengal

- সামসি মহাবিদ্যালয়
- Type: Undergraduate college Public college
- Established: 25 August 1968; 58 years ago
- Affiliations: University of Gour Banga
- Teacher In Charge: Tapas Kumar Barman
- Location: Samsi, West Bengal, 732139, India; 25.2872283°N 88.0004903°E
- Campus: Rural

- Location within West Bengal Location within India

Samsi College is an undergraduate college at Samsi under Chanchol police station in the Malda district of West Bengal, India. The college is affiliated to the University of Gour Banga, offering undergraduate courses.

== History ==
This is the second oldest higher education institute in the Malda district and primarily organized by the then President and District Magistrate of Maldah, Kamalakar Mishra (I.A.S.) in 1967. People living in and around Samsi donated money and land to establish the college. In 1968 the college formally opened, with classes at Samsi Agril High School. Within two years of its establishment, the college was able to construct its own temporary mud-building at the present site in the Kandaran area. There are two well-protected boys' and girls' hostels for the students who live some distance away.

== Departments ==
Arts and Commerce Faculty Departments
Departments
Bengali
English
Arabic
Sanskrit
History
Political Science
Philosophy
Commerce
Geography

== See also ==
- List of institutions of higher education in West Bengal
- Education in India
- Education in West Bengal
