= Chanchal College =

College in West Bengal, India

- Type: Undergraduate college Public college
- Established: 1969; 57 years ago
- Affiliations: University of Gour Banga
- Location: Chanchal, West Bengal, 732123, India; 25.3895585°N 88.0147858°E
- Campus: Urban
- Website: chanchalcollege.ac.in

- Location within West Bengal Location within India

Chanchal College is a college in Chanchal in the Malda district of West Bengal, India. The college is affiliated to the University of Gour Banga, offering undergraduate courses.

== Departments ==
Faculties and Departments
Faculty	Departments
Science	Chemistry, Physics, Mathematics, Geography,
Arts and Commerce	Arabic, Bengali, Commerce, Economics, Education, English, History, Philosophy, Political Science, Sanskrit, Sociology

== See also ==
- List of institutions of higher education in West Bengal
- Education in India
- Education in West Bengal
