= Barind Tract =

Coordinates: 24.8°N 88.7°E

Barind Tract (alternately called the Varendra Tract in English and Borendro Bhumi in Bengali) is the largest Pleistocene era physiographic unit in the Bengal Basin. It covers most of Dinajpur, Rangpur, Pabna, Rajshahi, Bogra, and Joypurhat districts of Rajshahi Division and Rangpur Division in Bangladesh. It is made up of several separate sections in the northwestern part of Bangladesh covering a total area of approximately 10,000 square kilometres (3,900 sq mi) of mostly old alluvium. On the eastern edge of the tract is a lower fault escarpment. The Little Jamuna, Atrai and Lower Punarbhaba rivers flow through the fault troughs. To the west, the main area is tilted up, and to the east this area is tilted downwards. The tract's climate shows greater extremes than much of India, with temperatures ranging from 45 °C to 5 °C. It is divided into three units: The Recent Alluvial Fan, the Barind Pleistocene, and the Recent Floodplain. These are divided by long, narrow bands of recent alluvium.

== See also ==
- Madhupur tract
- Geology of Bangladesh
