= Jagjivanpur =

Archaeological site in Malda, West Bengal, India

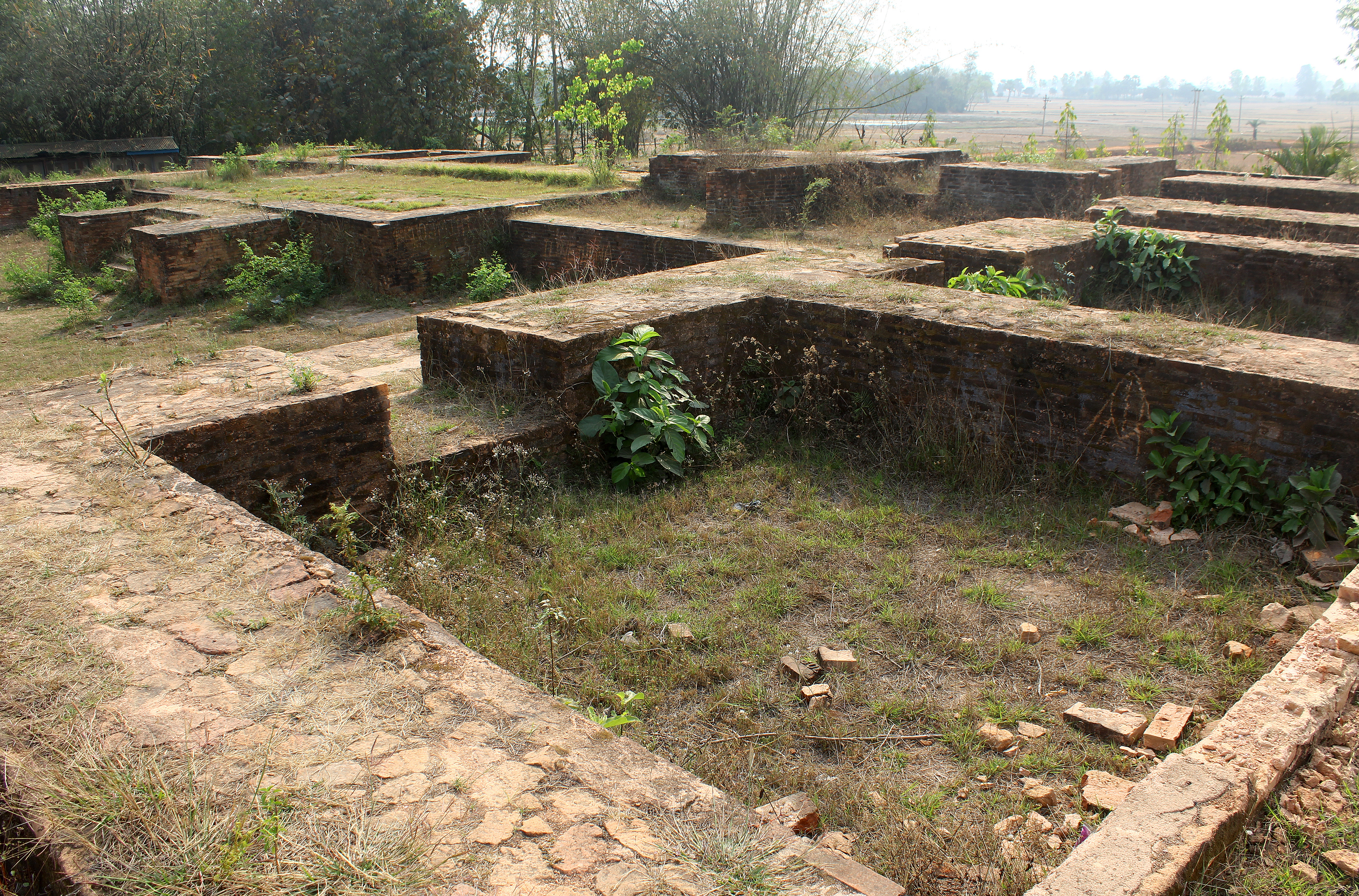

- Location within West Bengal Location within India
- 25.042423°N 88.403634°E
- Type: Archaeological site
- Location: West Bengal, India

History
- Built: 9th century AD

Site notes
- Excavation dates: 1992, 1994–95
- Archaeologists: Sudhin De, Amal Ray
- Owner: Directorate of Archaeology & Museums, Government of West Bengal

Jagajjibanpur or Jagajivanpur (in Bengali: জগজ্জীবনপুর) is an archaeological site in Habibpur block of Malda district in West Bengal state in eastern India. This site is located at a distance of 41 km east from English Bazar town. The most significant findings from this site include a copper-plate inscription of Pala emperor Mahendrapaladeva and the structural remains of a 9th-century Buddhist Vihara: Nandadirghika-Udranga Mahavihara.

The importance of this site was first indicated by the chance discovery of a copper plate inscription of the Pala emperor Mahendrapala on 13 March 1987 who was not known from any other sources till the date of this discovery. Later, the excavation by a team of the Directorate of Archaeology & Museums, West Bengal Government led by Sudhin De began in 1992 at Tulabhita mound, followed by an extensive excavation at the same site in 1995-96 under the direction of Amal Ray of the same directorate. The excavations resulted in discovery of a part of the brick built Vihara, stupas, cells with corbelled niches, verandah and many antiquities, which include terracotta plaques, terracotta seals and sealings, an inscribed potsherd, beads and other objects for daily use.

== Geography ==
Cities, towns and locations in the northern portion of Malda district (including Chanchal subdivision and Old Malda, Habibpur, Bamangola and Gazole CD blocks)
M: municipal town, CT: census town, R: rural/ urban centre, F: Facility, H: historical centre
Owing to space constraints in the small map, the actual locations in a larger map may vary slightly

=== Site ===
The site comprises a number of mounds, most impressive of them is the 5 m high Tulabhita or Salaidanga. other significant mounds are: Akhridanga, Nimdanga, Rajar Mayer Dhipi and Nandagarh. Another significant feature of the site is a large tank, Nandadighi (Nandadirghika of Maehndrapala's inscription) which still covers a large area. Tulabhita mound covers an area of 9432 m^{2}. Total 262 trenches ( 6 m x 6 m) were laid, of which 78 trenches have been excavated so far.

== Excavations and findings ==
The excavation has revealed six distinct layers of deposit, of which second to fourth are the most significant in terms of activities. Two phases of construction work can be identified. The first phase was probably abandoned due to the flood, the second period of construction started over it without any substantial chronological gap.

The excavation at the central part of the Tulabhita mound has revealed the eastern part of a burnt brick-built Vihara. A number of sizes of bricks (32 cm x 18 cm x 6 cm, 28 cm x 26 cm x 5 cm, 23 cm x 17 cm x 8 cm, 28 cm x 15 cm x 6 cm and 17 cm x 6 cm x 6 cm) and mud morter were used to construct the 1 m wide wall of the Vihara. The northeast and the southwest corners of the Vihara have been exposed. The exposed 1.7 m wide inner courtyard of the Vihara is made of rammed bricks with a tiled pathway. The post-holes have been traced along the pathway at a regular distance of 2.5 m. It probably indicates the existence of a shed over the pathway for circumambulation during the rainy season. A 3 m wide staircase with three steps at the eastern part of the courtyard attached to the verandah has been exposed. A brick stupa, having a circumference of 6 m and diameter of 2.25 m has also been identified. A part of the eastern verandah with rammed-floor of the Vihara has also been found.

The excavation at the southeast corner of the Tulabhita mound has exposed two monastic cells of 2.6 m x 2.6 m dimension with corbelled 1.05 m high niches on the southern wall of each cell. The height of the cells is 3 m. from the floor level. Originally an opening of 130 m x 1.28 m was provided on the partition wall between the cells, which was blocked later. Four distinct layers of deposit were excavated to reach the floor level of these cells.

A huge brick-built stupta along with a wall adjacent to its southern part has been exposed at the northwestern corner of the mound. Most probably this stupta is hollow inside. The excavation, which was carried out up to the depth of 1.5 m has exposed a niche on the southern side with a blocked opening indicative of the activities during the second phase. A few fragmentary gray colored potsherds were discovered at the core of the stupa. The extant height of this stupa is about 3.5 m and its circumference is 19.63 m.

== Artifacts ==
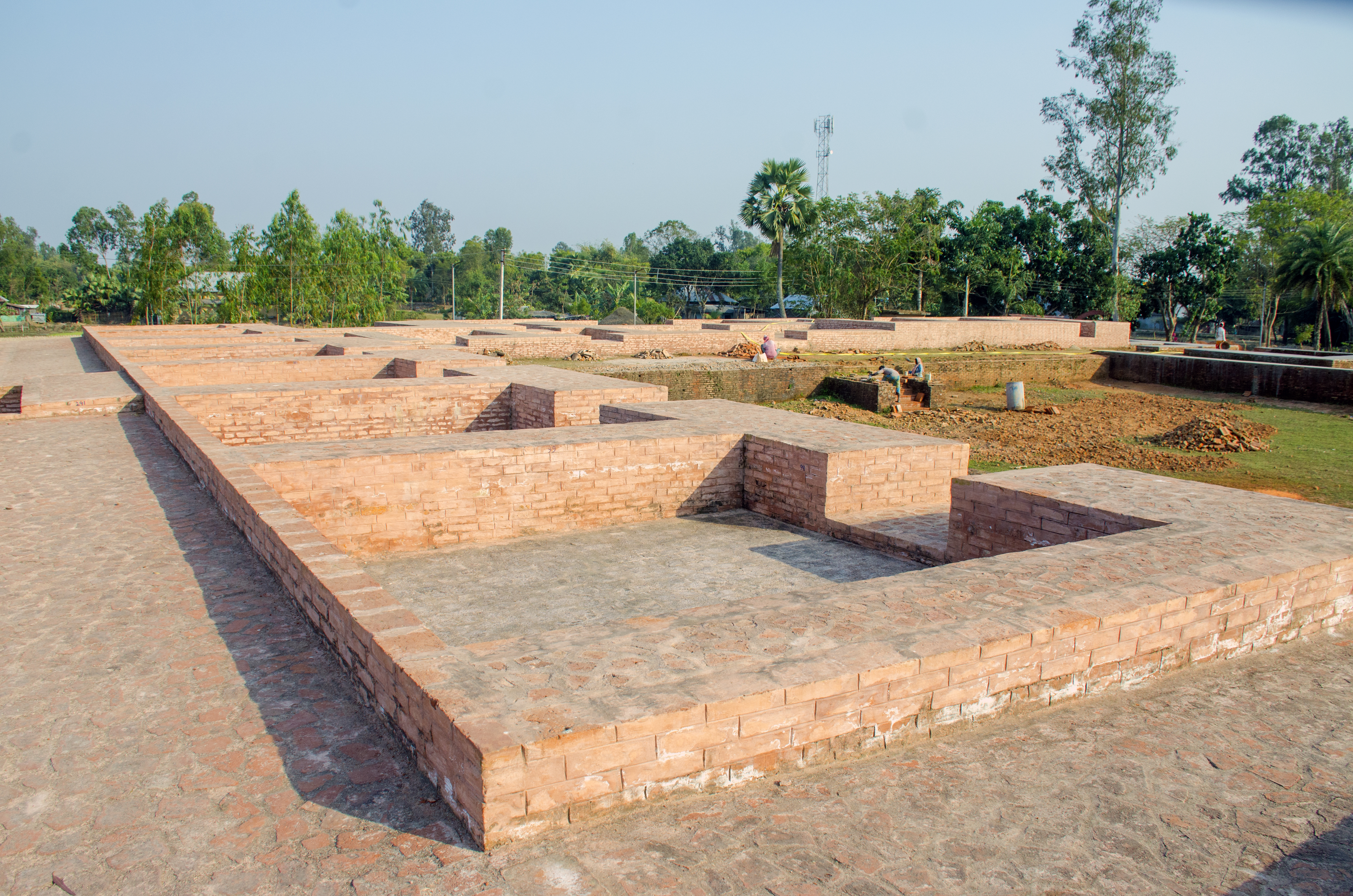
Nandadirghi Vihar

A significant number of artifacts were found from the site, which include the copper plate inscription of Mahendrapala (presently preserved in the Malda Museum), a 175 cm high bronze image of Marichi, more than a hundred terracotta seals and sealings, many terracotta plaques and decorated bricks. Before the commencement of the excavations, a small bronze seated image of Buddha in bhumisparshamudra (earth-touching gesture) was found from a local resident. Most of this artifacts are preserved at present in the Jagjivanpur gallery of the State Archaeological Museum at Behala, Kolkata along with a scaled model of the site.

=== The copper plate inscription of Mahendrapala ===
The copper plate is inscribed on both sides (40 lines on the obverse and 32 lines on the reverse) in Siddhamatrika script prevalent in the 9th century in Sanskrit language. A royal seal is attached to the top of the plate, which comprises within a lotus, a dharmachakra at the centre, flanked by deer on either side and the legend Shri Mahendrapaladeva below. The weight of the copper plate is 11.85 kg and it measures 52 cm x 37.5 cm. The copper plate was issued by the emperor Mahendrapala on the 2nd day of Vaisakha month of his seventh regnal year (854) from Kuddalakhataka jayaskandhavara (camp of victory) in the Pundravardhana bhukti. It states that the emperor Mahendrapala, the son and successor of Devapala, announced before the body of the officers and other persons assembled on the occasion of a land grant ceremony that his mahasenapati (general) Vajradeva had intended to donate the land adjacent to the Nandadirghika Udranga Mahavihara, erected by him for attainment of religious merits for his parents and all people on earth for the worship of the Buddhist deities and maintenance and performance of religious rites which include copying (manuscripts) by the monks residing in the Vihara.

=== The terracotta seals ===
The terracotta seals found from the site are circular in shape and inscribed with legends, varying from one to three lines. Most of these seals and sealings are monastic, though some of these are personal and votive in nature. Most notable discovery was a monastic seal depicting the dharmachakra and deer motif, which bears the name of the Vihara in two lines. Inscribed in Siddhamatrika script in Sanskrit language, the seal reads (as read by Debala Mitra): Shri Vajradeva Karita Nanda Dirghi Vihariya Arya Bhikshu Sam(ghasya) (of the venerable community of monks residing in the Nanda Dirghi Vihara which was caused to be built by Shri Vajradeva).

=== The terracotta plaques ===
More than 250 terracotta plaques have been discovered during the excavations from the collapsed debris of the stupa complex at the northwestern corner of the mound. Made of fine, levigated clay, often with a micaceous compound, the plaques are normally red in colour and rectangular in shape. These plaques were probably used to decorate the outer surface of the stupa as at Paharpur and Mainamati. The plaques are of different sizes, the most common size is 28 cm x 24 cm x 7 cm. Some of these are intact and in good state of preservation. These plaques depict Shiva, Surya, Avalokiteshvara, Vidyadharas, Gandharvas, Garuda, Kinnaras and Kinnaris, warriors, man with parasol, a devotee, boar, lion, deer, peacock and swan. A unique plaque depicts a sacred manuscript (most probably the prajnaparamita) on a lotus and a kneeling devotee.

=== The decorated bricks and other artifacts ===
A number of decorated tiled-bricks have been found from the site of sizes 28 cm x 23 cm x 8 cm, 32 cm x 24 cm x 6 cm and 33.5 cm x 23 cm x 6 cm. These bricks depict various motifs like scroll motif, lotus petal motif and diamond shaped chain motif. Some of these also depict mat design and geometrical shapes. The excavations also yielded beads of semi-precious stones of varying sizes, terracotta lamps, bangles of iron and terracotta, a small terracotta elephant, and many red and gray potshreds.
