= Mahananda River =

River in India and Bangladesh

Mahananda River Môhānôndā Nodi (Bengali)
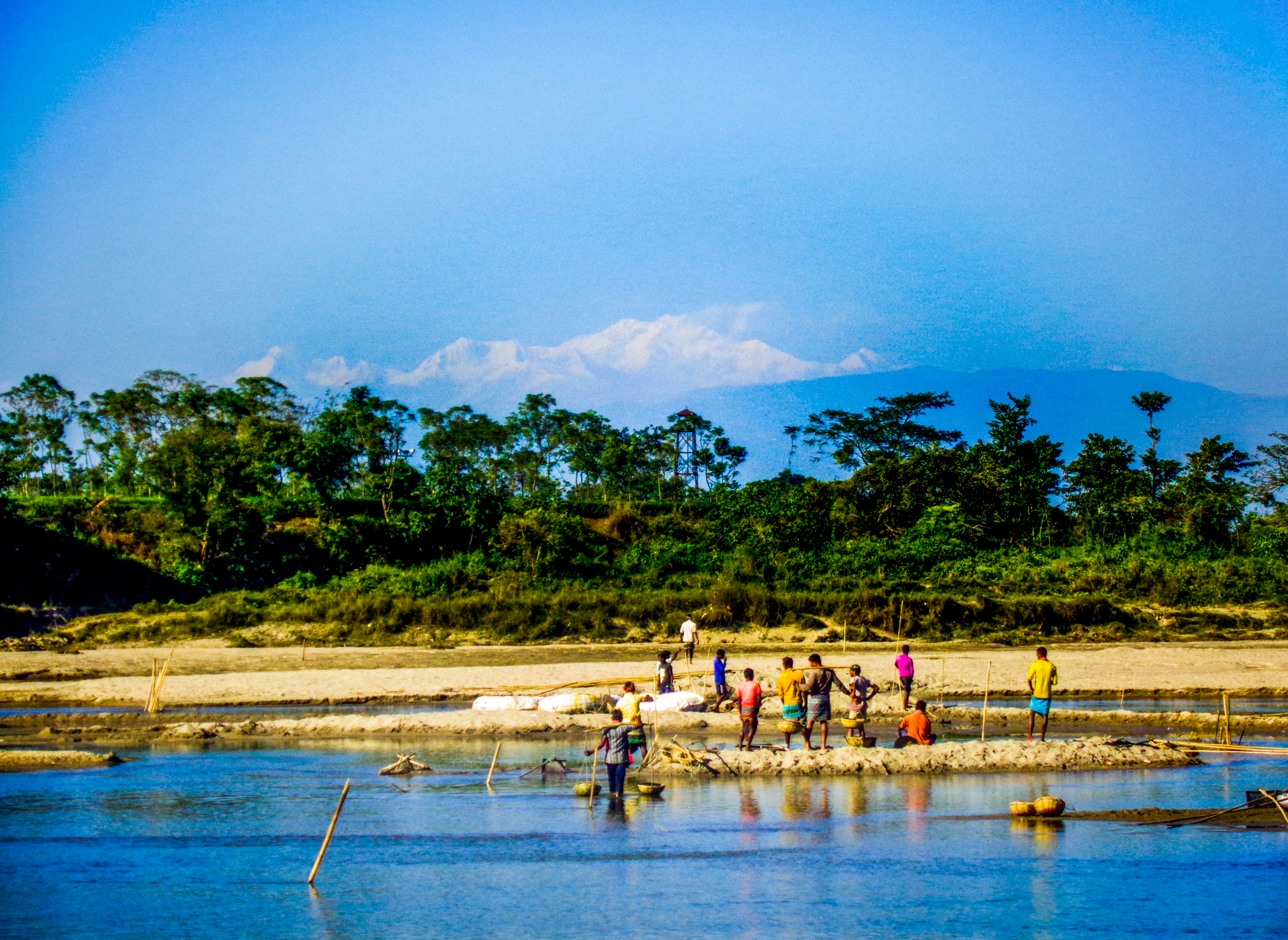
- People collecting stone at Mahananda River in Tetulia, Panchagarh District, Bangladesh with Kangchenjunga in the background

Location
- Countries: India and Bangladesh
- States: West Bengal (India); Bihar (India)
- Divisions: Rangpur (Bangladesh); Rajshahi (Bangladesh)
- Districts: Darjeeling (India), Jalpaiguri (India); Uttar Dinajpur (India); Kishanganj (India); Purnia (India); Katihar (India); Malda (India); Panchagarh (Bangladesh); Chapai Nawabganj (Bangladesh)
- Cities: Kurseong (India); Siliguri (India); English Bazar(India); Chapai Nawabganj (Bangladesh)

Physical characteristics
- Source: Paglajhora Falls, Darjeeling hills in the Himalayas
- Mouth: Ganges
  - location: Godagari, Rajshahi District, Bangladesh
  - coordinates: 24°29′24″N 88°18′14″E
- Length: 360 km (220 mi)
- Basin size: 20,600 km^{2} (8,000 sq mi)

Basin features
- Tributaries
  - left: Tangon River, Nagar River (Rangpur)
  - right: Mechi River, Kankai River, Balason River, Kalindi River

The Mahananda (/məˌhɑːˈnʌndə, ˌmɑːhə-/ mə-HAH-NUN-də, MAH-hə-) is a trans-boundary river that flows through the Indian states of Bihar and West Bengal before crossing into Bangladesh. It is an important tributary of the Ganges.

== Course ==
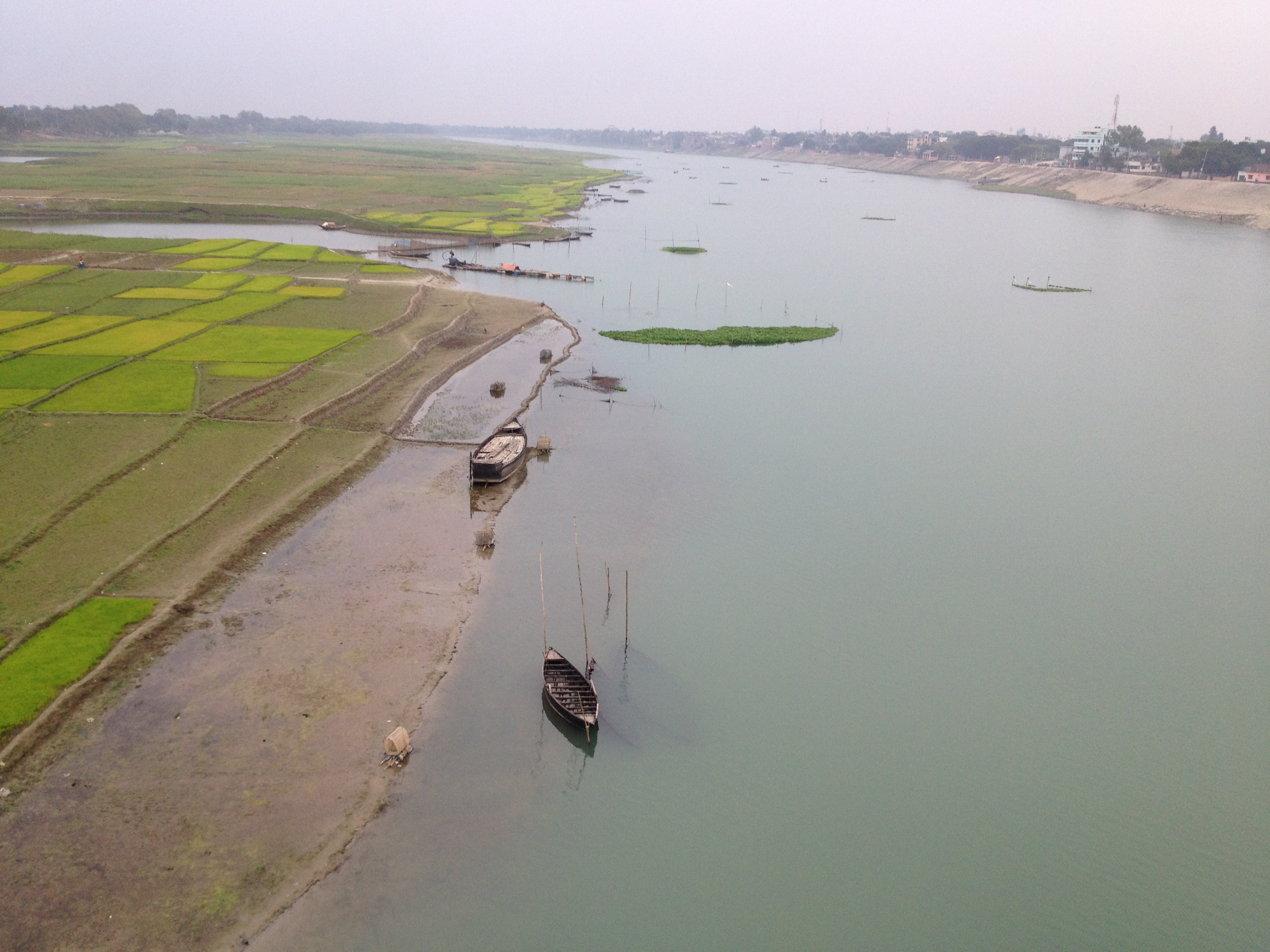
Mahananda River, view from captain Mohiudding Jahangir (Bir Shreshtha) bridge at Nawabganj district

Mahananda river originates in the Himalayas: Paglajhora Falls on Mahaldiram Hill near Chimli, east of Kurseong in Darjeeling district at an elevation of 2,100 metres (6,900 ft). It flows through Mahananda Wildlife Sanctuary and descends to the plains. It flows through the Siliguri city. Further it descends towards Fulbari in Jalpaiguri district of West Bengal, India.

After crossing Fulbari, the river enters Bangladesh near Tentulia in Panchagarh District, flows for 3 kilometres (1.9 mi) and again returns back to India. and further it flows through Uttar Dinajpur district in West Bengal and Kishanganj, Purnia and Katihar districts in Bihar, it enters Malda district in West Bengal. The Mahananda divides the district into two regions — the eastern region, consisting mainly of old alluvial and relatively infertile soil is commonly known as Barind (Barendrabhumi), and the western region, which is further subdivided by the river Kalindri into two areas, the northern area is known as "Tal". It is low-lying and vulnerable to inundation during rainy season; the southern area consists of very fertile land and is thickly populated, being commonly known as "Diara".

After flowing through Malda district of West Bengal, India, the river enters Bangladesh once again and joins the Ganges at Godagari in Rajshahi district in Bangladesh.

=== Basin data ===
The total length of the Mahananda is 360 kilometres (220 mi), out of which 324 kilometres (201 mi) are in India and 36 kilometres (22 mi) are in Bangladesh.

The total drainage area of the Mahananda is 20,600 square kilometres (8,000 sq mi) out of which 11,530 square kilometres (4,450 sq mi) are in India.

=== Tributaries ===
The main tributaries of the Mahananda are Balason, Mechi, Kankai and River Kalindri. At the East of the confluence of the Kalindri and the Mahananda lies the Old Malda town. In the Siliguri area it has three tributaries called the Trinai, Ranochondi and the pair of Chokor and Dauk taken as a single tributary.
