= Islam in West Bengal =

Muslims in West Bengal
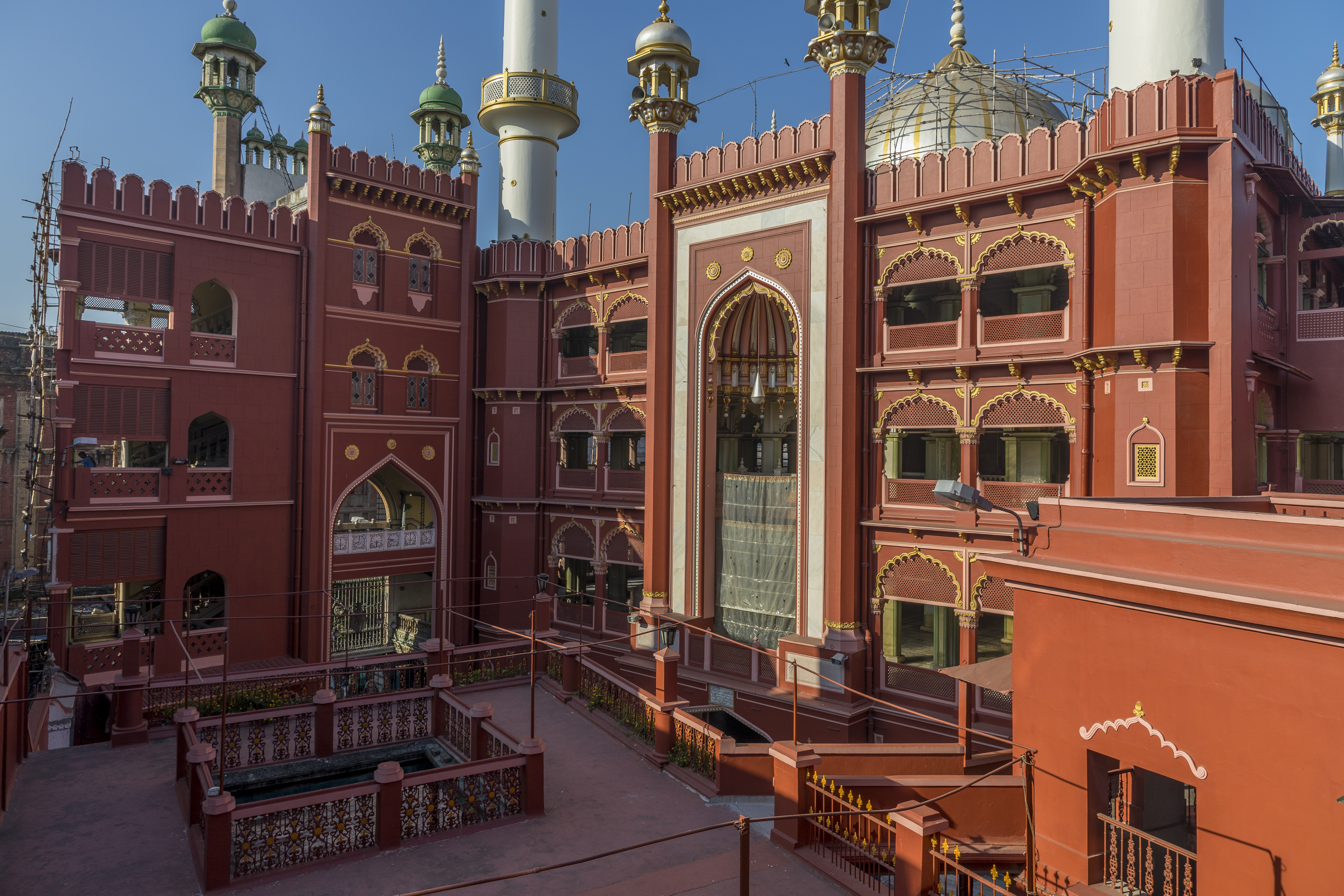
- Nakhoda Masjid, Kolkata

Total population
- 24,654,825 (2011 census) (27% of the state population)▲

Regions with significant populations
- Majority Murshidabad (66.3%) • Maldah (51.3%) • Uttar Dinajpur (50%) Significant minority Birbhum (37.1%) • South 24 Parganas (35.6%) • Nadia (26.76%) • Howrah (26.20%) • North 24 Parganas (25.82%)

Religions
- Sunni Islam

Languages
- Majority Bengali, Minority Urdu, Surjapuri, and others

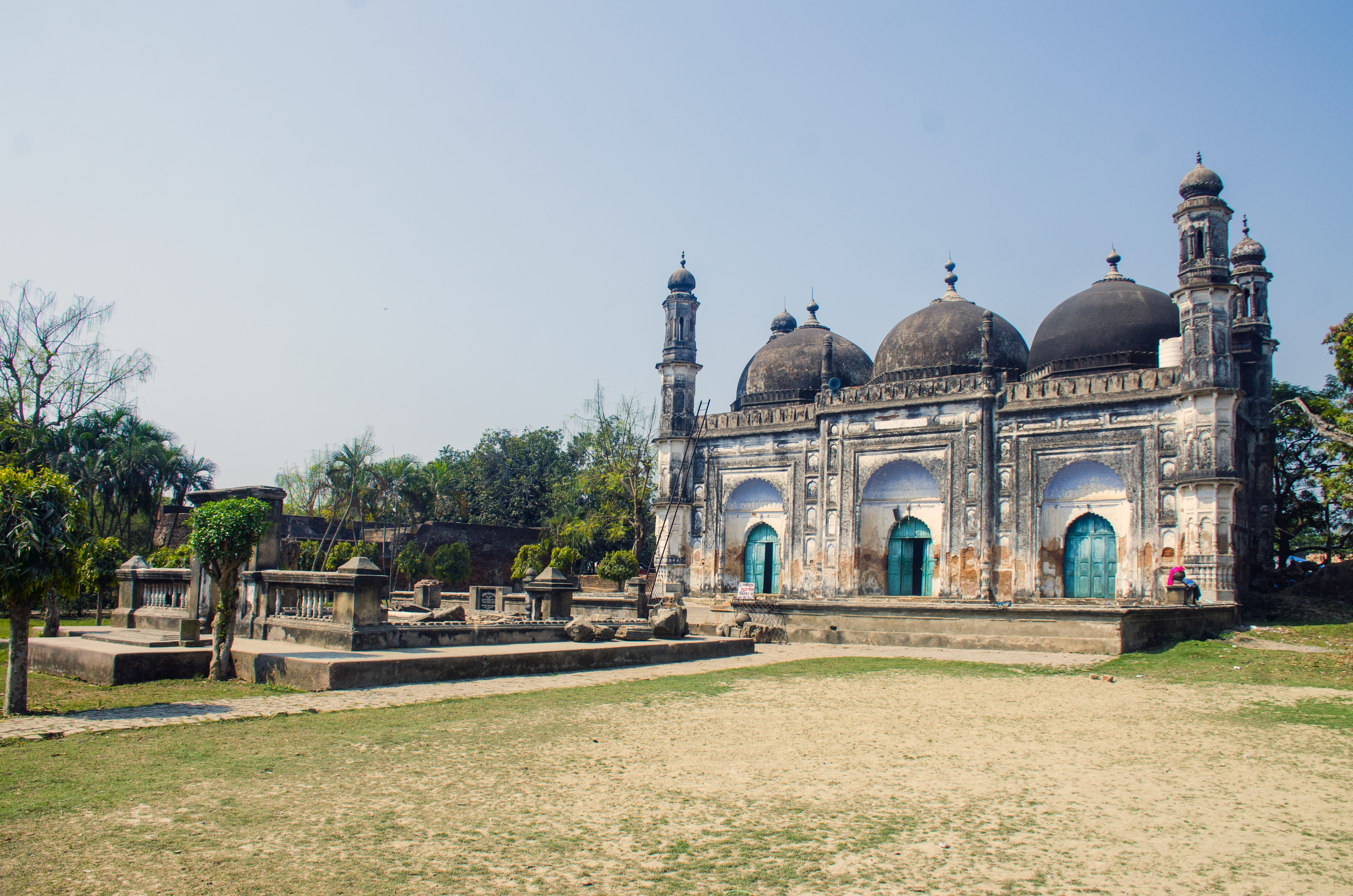
Motijheel Mosque, the oldest mosque of West Bengal, located in Murshidabad district

According to the 2011 census, West Bengal has over 24.6 million Muslims, making up 27% of the state's population. The vast majority of Muslims in West Bengal are ethnic Bengali Muslims, numbering around over 22 million and comprising 24.1% of the state population (mostly they reside in Rural areas). There also exists an Urdu-speaking Muslim community numbering 1.66 million, constituting 2.9% of the state population and mostly resides in Urban areas of the state.

Muslims form the majority of the population in three districts: Murshidabad, Malda and Uttar Dinajpur. Among these, Uttar Dinajpur is notable as ethnic Bengali Muslims comprise 28% of the district's population, with the remaining 22% being Urdu and Surjapuri speakers.

== History ==
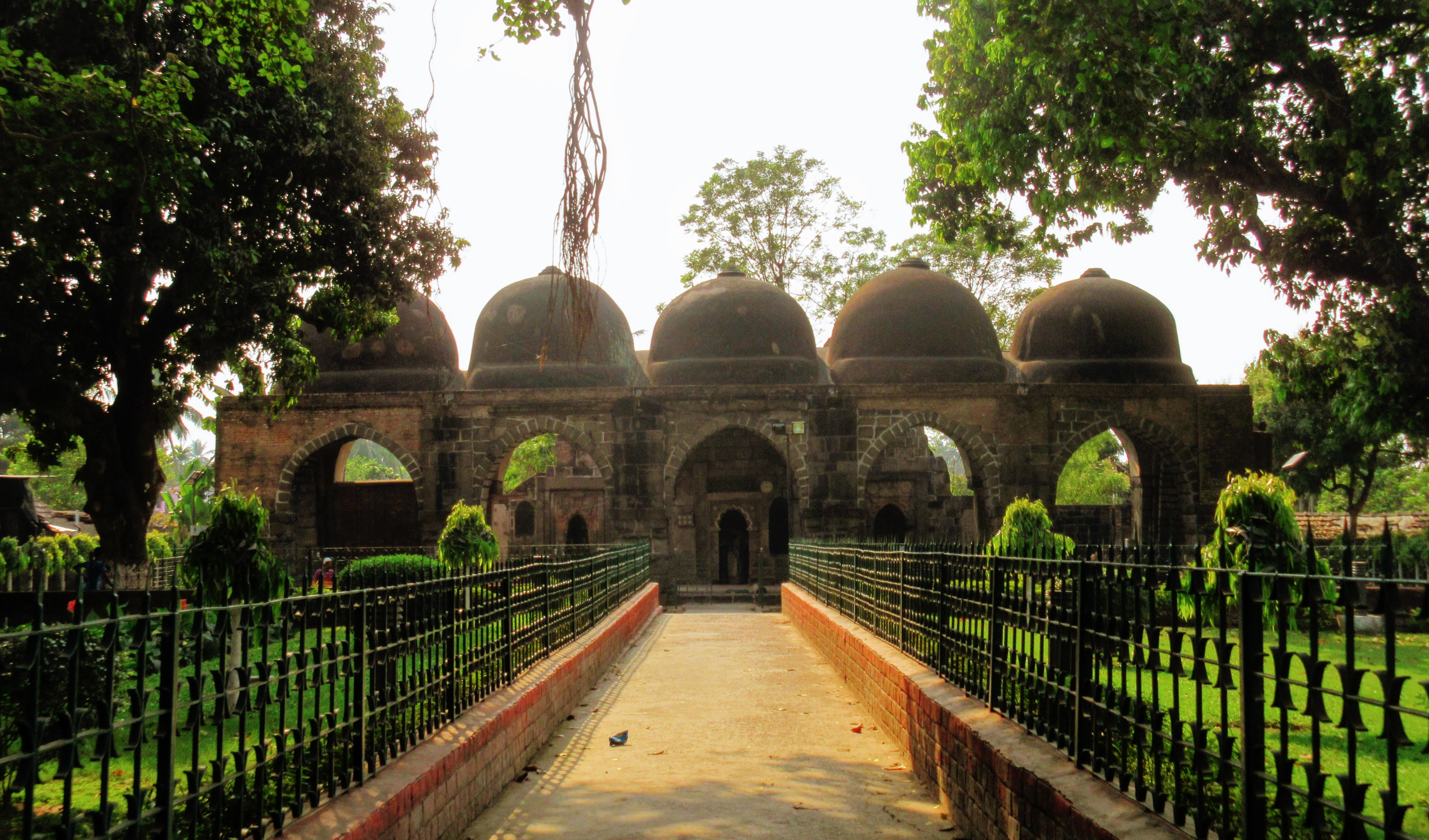
The Gazi Dargah (গাজী দরগা) of Tribeni (ত্রিবেনী) in West Bengal. This is one of the oldest Islamic heritage structures of Bengal

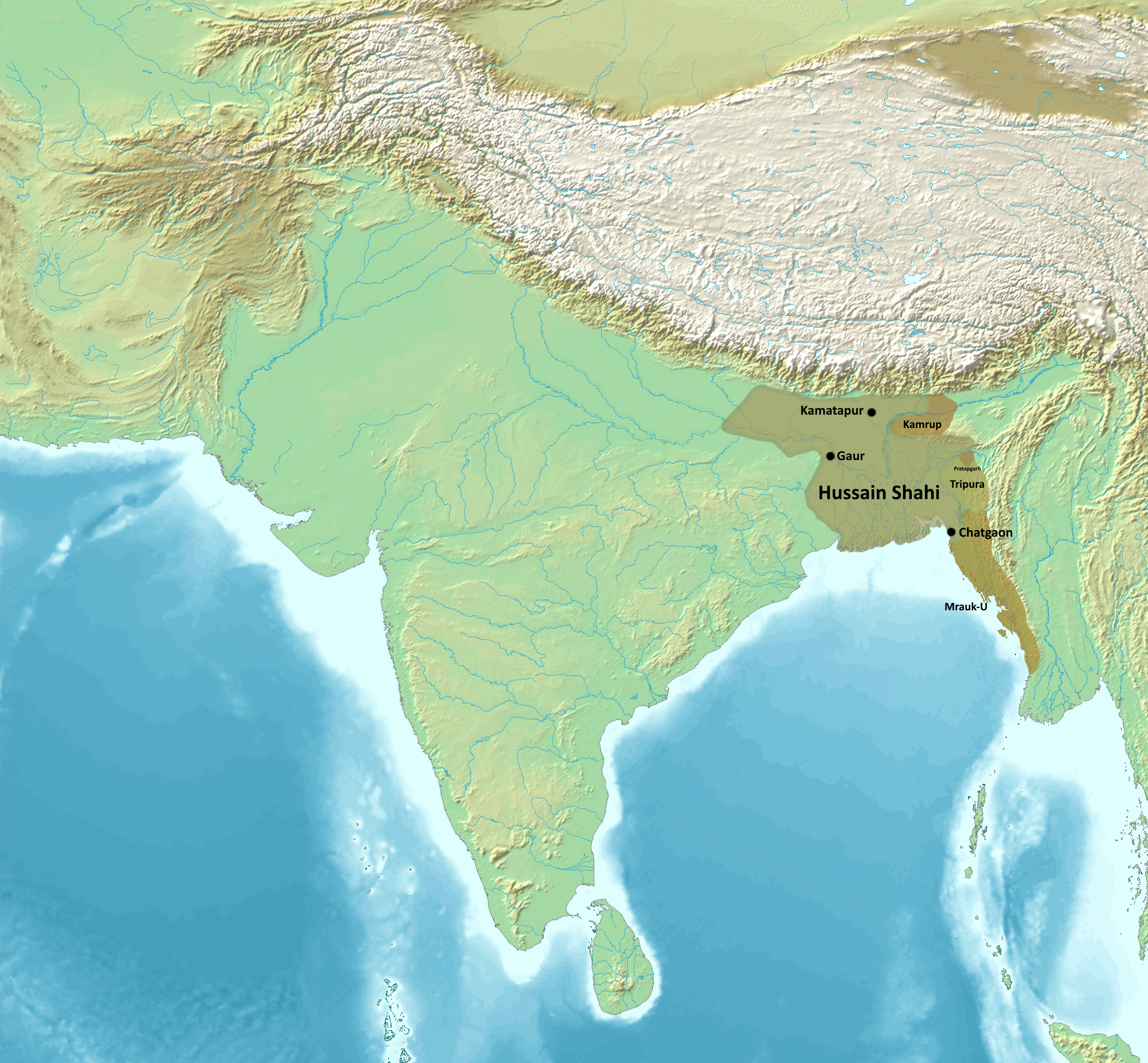
Historical Bengal sultanate

Islam first arrived in Bengal in the year 1204. The establishment of the first Muslim state in Bengal, the Bengal Sultanate, in 1352 by Shamsuddin Ilyas Shah is credited to giving rise to a Bengali socio-linguistic identity. The Sultanate's influence was expansive, with the Hindu-born sultan Jalaluddin Muhammad Shah funding the construction of Islamic institutions as far as Makkah Al Mukarramah and Madinah Al Munawwarah, which came to be known as al-Madaris al-Banjaliyyah (Bengali madrasas). Sufis also became prominent in this period, such as Usman Serajuddin, also known as Akhi Siraj Bengali, who was a native of Gaur in western Bengal and became the Sultanate's court scholar during Ilyas Shah's reign. Alongside Persian and Arabic, the Sultanate also used the Bengali language to gain patronage and support, contrary to previous states which exclusively favored liturgical languages such as Sanskrit and Pali. Islam became especially widespread when the region was under Mughal rule from 1576 to 1765 and was commonly known as Bengal Subah. The Mughal Emperors considered Bengal their most prized province. The Mughal emperor Akbar is credited with developing the modern Bengali calendar.

== Population ==
Historical Muslim Population in West Bengal
Year	Pop.	±%
1901	3,954,776	—
1911	2,955,098	−25.3%
1921	4,101,516	+38.8%
1931	4,521,313	+10.2%
1941	5,506,442	+21.8%
1951	4,402,330	−20.1%
1961	5,515,348	+25.3%
1971	7,983,963	+44.8%
1981	9,743,209	+22.0%
1991	12,050,000	+23.7%
2001	18,240,543	+51.4%
2011	24,654,825	+35.2%

As per as Indian Census figures, The Muslim population in West Bengal has increased from 19.85 per cent in 1951 to 27 per cent in 2011.

=== Partition and immigration ===
The Muslim population in West Bengal before 1947 partition was around 33%. After partition of Bengal in 1947, some Muslims from West Bengal left for East Pakistan, (Present-Day-Bangladesh). Estimates show that 1,634,718 Muslim refugees from West Bengal settling permanently in East Pakistan during 1947–1951.

=== Population by district (2011) ===
Percentage share of Muslims in the districts of West Bengal, 2011 Census

Muslims in West Bengal by district (2011)
#	District	Total population	Muslim population	%
1	Murshidabad	7,103,807	4,707,573	66.27%
2	South 24 Parganas	8,161,961	2,903,075	35.57%
3	North 24 Parganas	10,009,781	2,584,684	25.82%
4	Malda	3,988,845	2,045,151	51.27%
5	Bardhaman	7,717,563	1,599,764	20.73%
6	Uttar Dinajpur	3,007,134	1,501,170	49.92%
7	Nadia	5,167,600	1,382,682	26.76%
8	Birbhum	3,502,404	1,298,054	37.06%
9	Howrah	4,850,029	1,270,641	26.20%
10	Kolkata	4,496,694	926,414	20.60%
11	Hooghly	5,519,145	870,204	15.77%
12	Purba Medinipur	5,095,875	743,436	14.59%
13	Cooch Behar	2,819,086	720,033	25.54%
14	Paschim Medinipur	5,913,457	620,554	10.49%
15	Jalpaiguri	3,872,846	445,817	11.51%
16	Dakshin Dinajpur	1,676,276	412,788	24.63%
17	Bankura	3,596,674	290,450	8.08%
18	Purulia	2,930,115	227,249	7.76%
19	Darjeeling	1,846,823	105,086	5.69%

=== Linguistic groups ===
According to the census, there were around 24.6 million Muslims living in West Bengal, comprising 27% of the state's population. Nearly most of them, about 22 million are native Bengali Muslims, constituting around 90% of the total Muslim population in the state, and are mostly concentrated in rural and Semi Urban areas. The Urdu-speaking Muslims from Bihar and Uttar Pradesh constitute rest, numbering around 2.6 million and are mainly concentrated in Kolkata, Asansol, Islampur subdivision of West Bengal.

== Notable Muslims from West Bengal ==
- Murshid Quli Khan, the first Nawab of Bengal, Murshidaabad.
- Siraj ud-Daulah, last independent nawab of Bengal, Murshidaabad.
- Alivardi Khan, Nawab of Bengal, Murshidaabad.
- Titumir, Indian Bengali Revolutionary, Barasat, North 24 Parganas
- Kazi Nazrul Islam, Bengali poet and music lyricist composer, writer known as Bidrohi Kobi, Aasansol.
- Begum Rokeya, Bengali feminist thinker, writer, Philanthropist in Pre Independent India, Belgharia.
- Alimuddin Ahmad, Bengali Freedom Fighter in Pre Independent India, Kolkata
- Syed Badrudduja, Mayor of Kolkata
- Syed Mustafa Siraj, Indian Bengali Writer, Murshidaabad
- Masudur Rahman Baidya, First physically disabled Asian swimmer to cross the English Channel.
- Mohammed Ali Qamar is a first Bengali Indian to win a gold medal in Commonwealth Games, Kolkata.
- Abu Sayeed Ayyub, Sahitya Akademi Award winner Writer, literary critic, Educator in Kolkata.
- Abul Bashar, Banga Bhushan winner Novelist, Poet
- Farha Khatun is a National Awarded documentary filmmaker, Kolkata
- Muhammad Mohsin, Philanthropist and Educator.

=== Kolkata ===
- Wajid Ali Shah, last king of calcutta from Lucknow.
- Abu Sayeed Ayyub, Indian philosopher, teacher, literary critic and writer.
- Altamas Kabir, Indian former Chief Justice of India
- Alimuddin Ahmad, Indian Freedom Fighter
- Abdul Masood, Indian Former cricketer.
- Gauri Ayyub, Indian Teacher and Social activists
- Hashim Abdul Halim, Indian Speaker of the West Bengal Legislative Assembly
- Mohammed Ali Qamar, boxer, medalist in Commonwealth Games.
- Mohammad Hamid Ansari, former Vice President of India
- Mohammed Salim (footballer), Indian footballer
- Mohammed Salim (politician), The Minister for Technical Education and Training, Youth Welfare
- Muzaffar Ahmad, Indian journalist, essaist, and a co-founder of the Communist Party of India.
- Nusrat Jahan, Indian Bengali Actress.
- Firhad Hakim, Mayor of Kolkata, MIC Urban Development and Municipal Affairs
- Begum Rokeya, Bengali feminist thinker, writer, Philanthropist
- Farha Khatun, 67th National Film Awards Winner Documentary Filmmaker
- Sultan Ahmed (politician), Indian politician and former Union Minister of State Tourism.
- Noor Alam Chowdhury, Former Minister of Animal Resources Development.
- Mohammed Rafique (footballer), Indian footballer
- Sahil Khan, Indian gymnast and model of India
- Nafisa Ali, Indian actress, politician and social activist
- Pinky Lilani, Indian author, motivational speaker, food expert and women's advocate
- Rupam Islam, Founder of Bengali rock music band Fossils
- Kabir Suman, Indian Musician, lyricist, Former Journalists & Actor
- Kazi Masum Akhtar, Educator and writer and Padma Shri winner.
- Shehla Pervin, Indian Scientist

=== Malda ===
- Shahzada Barbak, the Sultan of Bengal
- Saifuddin Firuz Shah, the Sultan of Bengal
- Alaul Haq, Bengali Islamic scholar
- Ghulam Husain Salim, Historian
- Usman Serajuddin, Bengali Islamic scholar
- A B A Ghani Khan Choudhury, former Railways Minister (India)
- Mausam Noor former M.P of Maldaha Uttar
- Abu Hasem Khan Choudhury M.P of Maldaha Dakshin and Ex-State Health Minister
- Isha Khan Choudhury current M.L.A of Sujapur (Vidhan Sabha constituency)
- Abu Nasar Khan Choudhury Ex-M.L.A of Sujapur (Vidhan Sabha constituency) and Ex-Minister of Science and Technology
- Sabina Yeasmin current M.L.A of Mothabari and Minister of North Bengal Development, Irrigation Department
- Rubi Noor former three times M.L.A of Sujapur (Vidhan Sabha constituency)

=== Murshidabad ===
- Murshid Quli Khan, the first Nawab of Bengal
- Alivardi Khan, Nawab of Bengal
- Amina Begum, Princess of Bengal.
- Siraj ud-Daulah, last independent nawab of Bengal
- Abul Hayat, actor
- Mir Afsar Ali, radio jockey, actor
- Abdul Alim, folk singer, songwriter
- Rabiul Alam, actor
- Baby Islam, cinematographer and director
- Syed Mustafa Siraj, Bengali writer
- Mujibar Rahaman, Bengali Documentary Filmmaker
- Moinul Hassan, writer, member of Parliament of India
- Mabinul Haq, Bengali writer
- Moniruddin Khan, Bengali poet and writer
- Abul Bashar, Bengali writer
- Syed Badrudduja, Former mayor of Kolkata
- Jahanara Imam, writer and political activist
- Zainal Abedin, politician and four time former MP of Jangipur
- Niamot Sheikh, M.L.A of Hariharpara, Hariharpara
- Babar Ali (teacher), "youngest headmaster in the world" by BBC

=== Hooghly ===
- Mohammad Abu Bakr Siddique, was a Bengali Islamic scholar and the inaugural Pir of Furfura Sharif, West Bengal
- Abdul Mannan, politician
- Muhammad Mohsin, Bengali social reformer, Islamic scholar, philanthropist
- Syed Rahim Nabi, retired professional Indian international footballer who primarily played as a midfielder though he could play as a striker and defender.
- Abbas Siddiqui, founder of Indian Secular Front
- Nawsad Siddique, politician

=== Bardhaman ===
- Kazi Nazrul Islam, Bengali poet and music lyricist composer, writer known as Bidrohi Kobi.
- Abul Hashim, Islamic thinker and Freedom Fighter.
- Abdullah el Baqui, Bengali Islamic scholar, writer, Freedom Fighter.
- Nawab Abdul Jabbar, Indian bureaucrat, Social worker.
- Sheikh Saidul Haque, The first and incumbent M.P. from Bardhaman-Durgapur constituency.
- Abu Ayesh Mondal, Former chairman of West Bengal Minority Development & Finance Corporation.
- Siddiqullah Chowdhury, politician, minister and president Of Jamiat Ulema-e-Hind.

=== Birbhum ===
- Rezaul Karim, Nationalist.
- Ekram Ali, Bengali poet
- Mosarraf Hossain, Member of the West Bengal Legislative Assembly
- Manirul Islam (Indian politician),

=== North 24 Parganas ===
- Titumir One of the First Bengali Freedom Fighter
- Azizul Haque (educator), Educationist, Education minister for Bengal .
- Mohammad Akram Khan, Bengali journalist,
- Masudur Rahman Baidya, Bengali swimmer.
- Sheikh Sahil, Footballer
- Rafikul Islam Mondal Indian politician.
- Haji Nurul Islam Indian politician.
- Abdur Rahim Quazi Indian politician.
- ATM Abdullah Indian politician.

=== South 24 Parganas ===
- Abul Hasnat, Bengali physician .
- Abdur Razzak Molla, Former Minister for Land and Land Reforms
- Firdousi Begum, First Lady MLA of Sonarpur Uttar

=== Howrah ===
- Azangachhi Shaheb, Indian Sufi saint.
- Afsar Amed, Writer
- Hannan Mollah, social worker and MLA

=== Uttar Dinajpur ===
- Abdul Karim Chowdhury, Bengali Former Politician, Ex Minister for Mass Education Extension and Library Services.

=== Midanapur ===
- Ubaidullah Al Ubaidi Suhrawardy, Bengali Educationist.
- Khujista Akhtar Banu, writer, social reformer.
- Begum Badar un nissa Akhtar, Indian social reformer.
- Zahid Suhrawardy, jurist and lawyer.
- Hasan Shaheed Suhrawardy, Translator, art critic, Diplomat.
- Huseyn Shaheed Suhrawardy, Prime minister of Bengal.

=== Cooch Behar ===
- Abbasuddin Ahmed, Folk singer and Composer.
- Ferdausi Rahman, Folk singer
- Hussain Muhammad Ershad, military officer and politician who served as President of Bangladesh.

=== Jalpaiguri ===
- Khaleda Zia, politician who served as Prime Minister of Bangladesh.

=== Nadia ===
- Mohammad Mozammel Huq, Poet, novelist
- I'tisam-ud-Din, linguistic, Munshi in Mughal period.
- Azizunnessa Khatun, a Bengali poet, writer, and philanthropist.
- Nurun Nahar Faizannesa, Feminist.

== See also ==
- Islam in Bangladesh
- Bengali Muslims
- Islam in India
