= Kaliachak Assembly constituency =

Coordinates: 24.86°N 88.02°E

Kaliachak
- Former constituency No. 49 for the West Bengal Legislative Assembly

Constituency details
- Country: India
- Region: East India
- State: West Bengal
- District: Malda
- Lok Sabha constituency: Malda
- Established: 1951
- Abolished: 2011
- Reservation: None

Kaliachak Assembly constituency was an assembly constituency in Malda district in the Indian state of West Bengal.

== Overview ==
As a consequence of the orders of the Delimitation Commission, Kaliachak Assembly constituency ceases to exist from 2011. There are two new constituencies in the area – Mothabari Assembly constituency and Baisnabnagar Assembly constituency.

Kaliachak Assembly constituency was part of Malda (Lok Sabha constituency).

== Members of the Legislative Assembly ==
| Election Year | Constituency | Name of M.L.A. | Party affiliation |
|---|---|---|---|
| 1951 | Kaliachak (North) | A.B.A. Ghani Khan Choudhury | Independent |
| 1951 | Kaliachak (South) | Sowrindra Mohan Misra | Indian National Congress |
| 1957 | Kaliachak | Mahibur Rahman Choudhury | Indian National Congress |
| 1962 | | Promode Ranjan Bose | Independent |
| 1967 | | N.Islam | Communist Party of India (Marxist) |
| 1969 | | Shamsuddin Ahamed | Indian National Congress |
| 1971 | | Shamsuddin Ahamed | Indian National Congress |
| 1972 | | Shamsuddin Ahamed | Indian National Congress |
| 1977 | | Ahamed Shamsuddin | Indian National Congress |
| 1982 | | Promode Ranjan Bose | Communist Party of India (Marxist) |
| 1987 | | Dinesh Chandra Joarder | Communist Party of India (Marxist) |
| 1991 | | Dinesh Chandra Joarder | Communist Party of India (Marxist) |
| 1996 | | Abu Hasem Khan Choudhury | Indian National Congress |
| 2001 | | Abu Hasem Khan Choudhury | Indian National Congress |
| 2006 | | Biswanath Ghosh | Communist Party of India (Marxist) |

For MLAs from the area in subsequent years see Baisnabnagar Assembly constituency and Mothabari Assembly constituency

== Election results ==
=== 1977–2006 ===
In the 2006 state assembly elections, Biswanath Ghosh of CPI(M) won the Kaliachak assembly seat defeating his nearest rival Abu Hasem Khan Choudhury of Congress. Contests in most years were multi cornered but only winners and runners are being mentioned. Abu Hasem Khan Choudhury of Congress defeated Biswanath Ghosh of CPI(M) in 2001 and 1996. Dinesh Joardar of CPI(M) defeated Ahmed Shamsuddin of Congress in 1991 and 1987. Promode Ranjan Bose of CPI(M) defeated Ahmed Shamsuddin of Congress in 1982. Ahmed Shamsuddin of Congress defeated Promode Ranjan Bose of CPI(M) in 1977.

=== 1951–1972 ===
Shamsuddin Ahamed of Congress won in 1972, 1971 and 1969. N. Islam of CPI(M) won in 1967. Promode Ranjan Bose, Independent, won in 1962. Mahibur Rahman Choudhury of Congress won in 1957. In 1951, when independent India’s first election was held, there were two seats in Kaliachak. Abul Barkat Ataul Gani, Independent, won the Kaliachak (North) seat. Sowrindra Mohan Misra of Congress won the Kaliachak (South) seat.
