= Rubi Noor =

Indian politician (1945–2008)

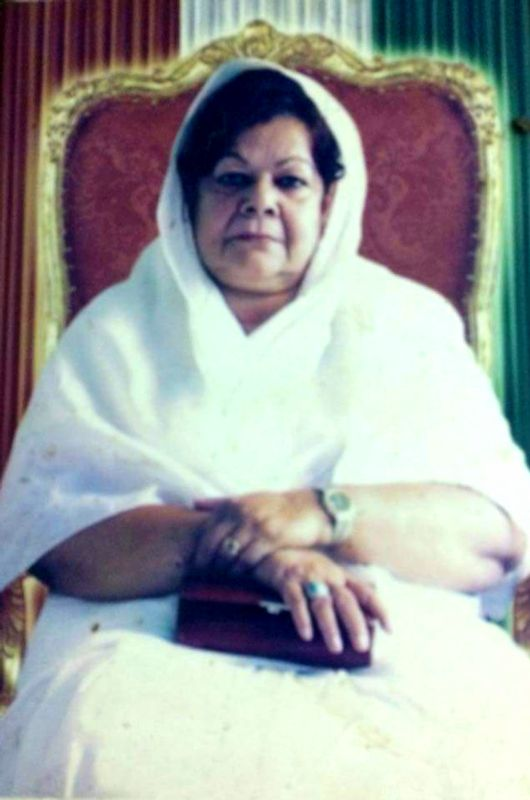

Member of West Bengal Legislative Assembly
- In office 1991–2008
- Succeeded by: Mausam Noor
- Constituency: Sujapur

Personal details
- Born: 12 August 1945 Malda, Bengal Province, British India
- Died: July 10, 2008 (aged 62) Kolkata, West Bengal, India
- Party: Indian National Congress
- Spouse: Syed Mohammad Noor
- Children: Sonya; Sayeda; Mausam

Rubi Noor (12 August 1945 – 10 July 2008) was an Indian politician and the leader of the Indian National Congress who served as four term MLA from Sujapur Assembly constituency. She was younger sister of A. B. A. Ghani Khan Choudhury and mother of Mausam Noor.

== Early life ==
Rubi Noor was born in 1945 at the Kotwali residence of the Khan Chowdhurys, a Bengali Muslim bloodline. After her primary education in Malda, she passed her school final from Shri Shikshayatan School in Kolkata in 1964.

She got married during her college days to Syed Mohammad Noor, a resident of Beck Bagan in Kolkata. He worked abroad and Rubi accompanied her husband to Canada. They returned to Kolkata in 1972.

== Political career ==
Rubi Noor entered politics in 1991 when she was 46. Her elder brother and the Congress leader, Ghani Khan Chowdhury, made her contest the Sujapur (Vidhan Sabha constituency). She won the Sujapur seat in 1991, 1996, 2001, and 2006.

In 2001, Ghani Khan Chowdhury made her the Malda district Congress president, a position she held till her death.

== Death ==
Rubi Noor suffered from lung cancer and died at Kolkata on 10 July 2008. After her death, her body was taken to the state assembly, which was adjourned after paying obituary tributes.

Her husband had died before her and she left behind three daughters, her eldest daughter Sonya Noor is an American Vascular surgeon and her middle daughter Sayeda Noor who has married her uncle Abu Hasem Khan Choudhury's son Isha Khan Choudhury and her youngest of whom, Mausam Noor, has entered politics after her death or she has served as M.P. from Maldaha Uttar.

In an obituary tribute The Telegraph wrote: “Over the years, her brother ingrained in her an insight into Bengal politics, which in turn helped her feel the pulse of electoral politics. Under her able leadership, the Congress came to power in the Malda zilla parishad this year without having to clutch on to other anti-Left parties. The new zilla parishad sabhadhipati, Sabina Yasmeen, was Ruby’s choice despite several attempts made by Congress dissidents to thwart her move.”
