= Abdul Ghani (Indian politician) =

Indian politician and former jurist

Justice Abdul Ghani

Member of the West Bengal Legislative Assembly
- In office 6 May 2021 – 4 May 2026
- Preceded by: Isha Khan Choudhury
- Succeeded by: Sabina Yeasmin
- Constituency: Sujapur
- Majority: 1,30,163
- In office 27 May 2016 – 4 May 2021
- Preceded by: Abul Kasem Molla
- Succeeded by: Sitanath Ghosh
- Constituency: Jagatballavpur
- Majority: 24,681

Judge of Calcutta High Court
- In office 24 June 2009 – 7 January 2012
- Nominated by: K. G. Balakrishnan
- Appointed by: Pratibha Patil

Personal details
- Born: 7 January 1950 (age 76) Sujapur, Malda, West Bengal, India
- Party: Trinamool Congress
- Education: M.A. (English); L.L.B
- Alma mater: Malda College; Bhagalpur Law College
- Profession: Jurist

Muhammad Abdul Ghani (born 7 January 1950) is an Indian politician and former jurist from West Bengal who has been serving as a member of the West Bengal Legislative Assembly from Sujapur seat since 6 May 2021. A member of Trinamool Congress, he represented the Jagatballavpur constituency from 2016 until 2021. Before that, he served as judge of Calcutta High Court from 2009 until 2012.

== Early life ==
Ghani was born on 7 January 1950 in Sujapur city, Malda. His father was Haji Md. Hossain Mia. He studied at Naimouza High School till 1965. He earned a M.A. degree in English from Malda college in 1972 and an L.L.B. from Tilka Manjhi Bhagalpur University in 1973.

== Judicial career ==
Ghani joined Maldah District Court in 1974 as a magistrate. Later he became a West Bengal Civil Service (Judicial) officer in January 1978 as a P.S.C. candidate. He was assigned to several judicial assignments in different districts of West Bengal.

Ghani was appointed by the Left Front Administration as Deputy Secretary and Joint Secretary in the Department of Law, Government of West Bengal. He then became District and Sessions Judge in Birbhum in 2003. He was then transferred as a judge in Calcutta Civil Court.

Ghani was elevated to the Bench in the High Court of Calcutta as permanent Judge on 24 June 2009. He retired in 2012.

== Political career ==
He joined Trinamool Congress. He was elected from Howrah's Jagatballavpur seat in 2016. Later he was elected in the Sujapur seat defeating his rival Isa Khan Chowdhury from INC by 1,30,163 votes, becoming the candidate having largest votes in 2021 elections. He became the chairman of the West Bengal Wakfs Board by the Madrasah Education ministry.
