= Chandana Sarkar =

Indian politician

Member of the West Bengal Legislative Assembly
- In office 2 May 2021 – 5 May 2026
- Preceded by: Swadhin Kumar Sarkar
- Constituency: Baisnabnagar
- Succeeded by: Raju Karmakar

Personal details
- Born: Gazole, West Bengal, India
- Party: All India Trinamool Congress
- Spouse: Paritosh Sarkar (Bachhu Master)
- Children: 2
- Profession: Politician

Chandana Sarkar is an Indian politician. She was elected to the West Bengal Legislative Assembly from Baisnabnagar as a member of the Trinamool Congress. She is referred to as the people's helper. She was elected President of Malda Zilla Parishad.
