= Abul Kashem (disambiguation) =

Abul Kashem, Abul Kasem, or Abul Qasim is a masculine given name and surname of Arabic origin. Notable people with the name include:

== Given name ==
=== Abul Kasem ===
- Abul Kasem (Chittagong politician) (1911–1999), Bangladeshi politician
- Abul Kasem (politician, born 1872) (1872–1936), Bangladeshi politician
- Abul Kasem Molla, Indian politician

=== Abul Kashem ===
- Abul Kashem (1920–1991), Bangladeshi pioneer
- Abul Kashem (Dhaka politician) (died 2020), Bangladeshi politician
- Abul Kashem (Tangail politician) (1941/42–2024), Bangladeshi politician
- Abul Kashem Fazlul Haq (1940–2026), Bangladeshi writer, essayist, translator, critic, columnist, and activist
- Abul Kashem Khan (1905–1991), Bangladeshi lawyer, industrialist, and politician
- Abul Kashem Sandwip (1944–1995), Bangladeshi educationist, journalist, and organizer

=== Abul Qasim ===
- Abul Qasim ibn Mohammed al-Ghassani (1548–1610), Moroccan medical doctor, writer, and diplomat
- Abul Qasim Nomani (born 1947), Indian Islamic scholar

== Surname ==
=== Abul Kashem ===
- Md. Abul Kashem, Bangladeshi academic
- Mohammad Abul Kashem, Bangladeshi police officer

=== Abul Quasem ===
- Mohammad Abul Quasem (1913–??), Bangladeshi politician
