= Uma Roy =

Indian politician

Member of Parliament, Lok Sabha
- In office 1967-1971
- Preceded by: Renuka Ray
- Succeeded by: Dinesh Chandra Joarder
- Constituency: Malda, West Bengal

Personal details
- Born: 1919 Rajshahi, Bengal Presidency, British India
- Died: 19 December 1999 (aged 79–80) Malda
- Party: Indian National Congress
- Spouse: Ramhari Roy
- Children: Tilak Roy, Dipak Roy, Prabhati Chakraborty

Uma Roy (1919 – 19 December 1999) was an Indian politician belonging to the Indian National Congress. She was elected to the Lok Sabha, lower house of the Parliament of India from Malda in 1967. She was the founder of a higher secondary school at Malda. She established a welfare organisation and provided self-employment to the poor and needy women, as a cooperative organisation in Malda.
