= Anupam Ghosh =

Indian politician

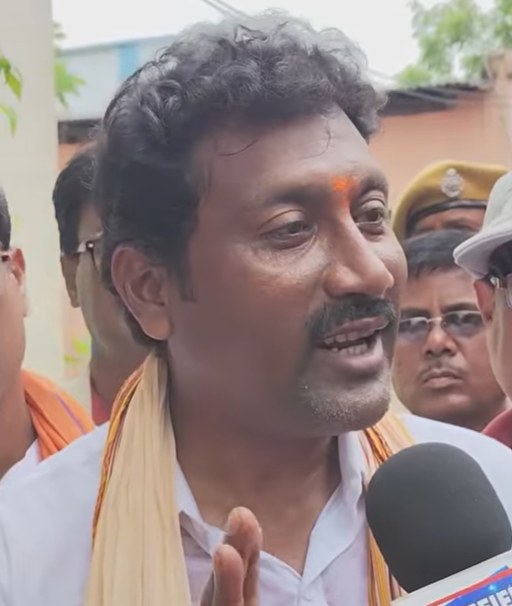

Member of the West Bengal Legislative Assembly
- Incumbent
- Assumed office 4 May 2026
- Preceded by: Sitanath Ghosh
- Constituency: Jagatballavpur

Personal details
- Party: Bharatiya Janata Party
- Parent: Santipada Ghosh
- Education: Graduation in B.A. from University of Calcutta in the year 2002
- Profession: Politician

Anupam Ghosh is an Indian politician from West Bengal. He is a member of the West Bengal Legislative Assembly from Jagatballavpur representing the Bharatiya Janata Party (BJP). He first ran for the position as an MLA in 2021 West Bengal Legislative Assembly election but was defeated by Sitanath Ghosh of All India Trinamool Congress (AITC), later in 2026 West Bengal Legislative Assembly election he became the MLA of Jagatballavpur after defeating Subir Chatterjee of AITC by 6671 votes.
