= Baisnabnagar Assembly constituency =

West Bengal Legislative Assembly constituency

Baisnabnagar
- Constituency No. 54 for the West Bengal Legislative Assembly
- Interactive Map Outlining Baisnabnagar Assembly Constituency

Constituency details
- Country: India
- Region: East India
- State: West Bengal
- District: Malda
- Lok Sabha constituency: Maldaha Dakshin
- Established: 2011
- Total electors: 246,956
- Reservation: None

Member of Legislative Assembly
- 18th West Bengal Legislative Assembly
- Incumbent Raju Karmakar
- Party: Bharatiya Janata Party
- Elected year: 2026

Baisnabnagar Assembly constituency is an assembly constituency in Malda district in the Indian state of West Bengal.

== Overview ==
As per orders of the Delimitation Commission, No. 54 Baisnabnagar Assembly constituency covers Kaliachak III community development block.

Baisnabnagar Assembly constituency is part of No. 8 Maldaha Dakshin (Lok Sabha constituency).

== Members of the Legislative Assembly ==
Election	Member	Party
2011	Isha Khan Choudhury	Indian National Congress
2016	Swadhin Kumar Sarkar	Bharatiya Janata Party
2021	Chandana Sarkar	Trinamool Congress
2026	Raju Karmakar	Bharatiya Janata Party

For MLAs from the area in previous years see Kaliachak Assembly constituency

== Election results ==
=== 2026 ===
2026 West Bengal Legislative Assembly election: Baisnabnagar
Party	Candidate	Votes	%	±%
BJP	Raju Karmakar	108,692	48.34	+9.72
AITC	Chandana Sarkar	61,811	27.49	−12.32
INC	Mamuni Mandal	46,450	20.66	+2.71
NOTA	None of the above	1,789	0.80	−0.02
Majority		46,881	20.85	+19.66
Turnout		224,839	96.02	+11.53
BJP gain from AITC		Swing		

=== 2021 ===
West Bengal assembly elections, 2021: Baisnabnagar constituency
Party	Candidate	Votes	%	±%
AITC	Chandana Sarkar	83,061	39.81	
BJP	Swadhin Kumar Sarkar	80,590	38.62	
INC	Azizul Hoque	37,443	17.95	
BSP	Nikhil Chandra Mandal	2,282	1.09	
NOTA	None of the above	1,705	0.82	
Majority		2,471	1.19	
Turnout		208,652	84.49	
AITC gain from BJP		Swing		

=== 2016 ===
In the 2016 election, Swadhin Kumar Sarkar of the BJP defeated Azizul Haque of the INC-CPI(M) alliance.

2016 West Bengal Legislative Assembly election: Baisnabnagar
Party	Candidate	Votes	%	±%
BJP	Swadhin Kumar Sarkar	70,185	38.20	+24.12
INC	Azizul Haque	65,688	35.75	−7.27
AITC	Asit Bose	40,262	21.91	N/A
SS	Dhaneshyam Das	1,528	0.83	N/A
BSP	Nikhil Chandra Mondal	1,525	0.83	N/A
Independent	Suresh Chandra Sarkar	1,301	0.70	N/A
CPI(ML)L	Md. Ebrahim Sheikh	713	0.38	N/A
NOTA	None of the above	2,520	1.37	N/A
Majority		4,497	2.45	−1.00
Turnout		183,722		
BJP gain from INC		Swing	+8.43	

=== 2011 ===
In the 2011 election, Ishaque Khan Chowdhury of Congress defeated his nearest rival Biswanath Ghosh of CPI(M).

West Bengal assembly elections, 2011: Baisnabnagar constituency
Party	Candidate	Votes	%	±%
INC	Ishaque Khan Choudhury	62,589	43.02	
CPI(M)	Biswanath Ghosh	57,566	39.57	
BJP	Swadhin Kumar Sarkar	20,483	14.08	
Independent	Manirul	3,436	2.36	
JD(U)	Manjur Alahi Munshi	1,415		
Majority		5,023	3.45	
Turnout		145,489	84.34	
INC win (new seat)				
