= M. Ansaruddin =

Indian politician

M. Ansaruddin is an Indian politician from West Bengal. He is a former five time member of the West Bengal Legislative Assembly from Jagatballavpur Assembly constituency in Howrah district. He was last elected in the 1996 West Bengal Legislative Assembly election representing the Communist Party of India (Marxist).

== Early life and career ==
Ansauddin is from Jagatballavpur, Howrah district, West Bengal.

He was elected as an MLA for the first time winning the 1977 West Bengal Legislative Assembly election from Jagatballavpur Assembly constituency representing the Communist Party of India (Marxist). He retained the seat for the Communist Party in the 1982 West Bengal Legislative Assembly election and won for a third time winning the 1987 West Bengal Legislative Assembly election. He won again representing the Communist Party of India (Marxist) in the 1991 and 1996 Assembly elections to complete five consecutive terms as an MLA. In the 1991 West Bengal Legislative Assembly election he beat his nearest opponent, Pulak Sarkar of the Indian National Congress . In 1996, he defeated Nityananda Maity of the Indian National Congress. He defeated Binodananda Banerjee, also of the Congress in 1987, and Nemai Porel, an independent candidate in the 1982 election and Brindaban Ghosh of the Congress in 1977 Assembly election.

He lost the 2001 West Bengal Legislative Assembly election to Biman Chakrabarthy of the All India Trinamool Congress by a margin of 607 votes.
