= Swadhin Kumar Sarkar =

Indian politician

Member of West Bengal Legislative Assembly
- In office 19 May 2016 – 2 May 2021
- Preceded by: Isha Khan Choudhury
- Succeeded by: Chandana Sarkar
- Constituency: Baisnabnagar

Personal details
- Born: 1958 or 1959 (age 67–68)
- Party: BJP
- Education: B.Sc. (Bio), Bangabasi College
- Profession: Agriculture

Swadhin Kumar Sarkar is an Indian politician and a Member of Bhartiya Janta Party. He was MLA from Baishnabnagar-54 constituency from the period of 2016 to 2021. He lost the election in 2021 WBLA elections.

== Early life ==
Sarkar was born to Dwijinder Nath Sarkar. He hails from the village Sarkartola in Malda district of West Bengal. He graduated with a Bachelor of Science degree in biology from Bangabasi College in 1981.

== Political career ==
In the 2016 West Bengal Legislative Assembly election, Sarkar defeated his nearest rival Azizul Haque of Indian National Congress by 4,497, thus becoming one of three MLAs of Bharatiya Janata Party to be elected in West Bengal Legislative Assembly.

State Legislative Assembly
Preceded by Isha Khan Choudhury (INC)	Member of the West Bengal Legislative Assembly from Baisnabnagar Assembly constituency 2016–	Incumbent
