= Md. Najrul Islam =

Indian politician

Md Najrul Islam

Member of the West Bengal Legislative Assembly
- Incumbent
- Assumed office 2026
- Preceded by: Sabina Yeasmin
- Constituency: Mothabari

Personal details
- Party: All India Trinamool Congress (until 2026); Democratic Trinamool Congress (from 2026)
- Profession: Politician

Md Najrul Islam is an Indian politician and member of the Democratic Trinamool Congress. He was elected as a Member of the West Bengal Legislative Assembly from the Mothabari constituency in the 2026 West Bengal Legislative Assembly election.
