= Renuka Ray =

Indian politician

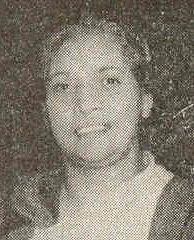

Member of Parliament, Lok Sabha
- In office 1957–1967
- Preceded by: Surendra Mohan Ghose
- Succeeded by: Uma Roy
- Constituency: Malda, West Bengal

Personal details
- Born: 4 January 1903 Calcutta, Bengal presidency, British India
- Died: 11 April 1997 (aged 93) Malda, West Bengal, India
- Party: Indian National Congress
- Parent: Satish Chandra Mukherjee
- Awards: Padma Bhushan

Renuka Ray (4 January 1903 – 11 April 1997) was a noted freedom-fighter, social activist and politician of India.

She was a descendant of Brahmo reformer, Nibaran Chandra Mukherjee, and daughter of Satish Chandra Mukherjee, an ICS officer, and Charulata Mukherjee, a social worker and member of the All India Women’s Conference. She was awarded the Padma Bhushan by the Government of India in 1988.

== Early life and education ==
She came in contact with Mahatma Gandhi at an early age of sixteen and was greatly influenced by him. She left college to answer Gandhiji's call for boycotting the British Indian educational system. However, later when her parents persuaded Gandhiji to ask her to go to London for further studies, she joined London School of Economics in 1921. She was married to Satyendra Nath Ray at an early age.

Her maternal grandparents were the most distinguished couple of their times. Maternal grandfather Prof. P K Roy was the first Indian to receive a D Phil from Oxford University and a member of the Indian Education Service and the first Indian Principal of the prestigious Presidency College, Calcutta. Maternal grandmother Sarala Roy was a well known social worker who worked for the emancipation of women. She was the founder of Gokhale Memorial School and College and the first Indian woman to be a member of the senate, Calcutta University. Sarala Roy was the daughter of renowned Brahmo reformer Durgamohan Das and sister of Lady Abala Bose and S R Das, the founder of prestigious Doon School and a cousin of Deshbandhu C R Das.

== Career ==
On returning to India, she joined All India Women’s Conference and worked hard to champion women's rights and inheritance rights in parental property. In 1932 she became President of All India Women’s Conference. She was also its president for the years 1953–54.

In 1943 she was nominated to Central Legislative Assembly as a representative of women of India. She was also a member of Constituent Assembly of India in 1946–47.

She was appointed as Minister of Relief & Rehabilitation, West Bengal in the years 1952–57. She was also Lok Sabha member for the years 1957–1967 from Malda Lok Sabha constituency. In year 1959 she headed a committee on Social Welfare and Welfare of Backward Classes, which is popularly known as Renuka Ray Committee.

Among her siblings Subroto Mukherjee was the first air chief marshal of Indian Air Force who died in Tokyo and was married to Sharda Mukherjee (née' Pandit) a niece-in-law of Vijaya Lakshmi Pandit and Prashanta Mukherjee who was the chairperson of the Indian Railway Board and was married to Keshab Chandra Sen's granddaughter Violet. Her younger sister Nita Sen's daughter Geeti sen is a noted art historian and editor-inchief of IIC, Quarterly and married to renowned Bollywood film director Muzaffar Ali.

== Works ==
She is author of the book My Reminiscences: Social Development During the Gandhian Era and After.
