= Jagatballavpur Assembly constituency =

Jagatballavpur
- Constituency No. 183 for the West Bengal Legislative Assembly
- Interactive Map Outlining Jagatballavpur Assembly Constituency

Constituency details
- Country: India
- Region: East India
- State: West Bengal
- District: Howrah
- Lok Sabha constituency: Sreerampur
- Established: 1951
- Total electors: 225,602
- Reservation: None

Member of Legislative Assembly
- 18th West Bengal Legislative Assembly
- Incumbent Anupam Ghosh
- Party: BJP
- Alliance: NDA
- Elected year: 2026

Jagatballavpur Assembly constituency is an assembly constituency in Howrah district in the Indian state of West Bengal.

== Overview ==
As per orders of the Delimitation Commission, No. 183 Jagatballavpur Assembly constituency is composed of the following:Baragachhia I, Baragachhia II, Hantal Anantabati, Jagatballavpur I, Jagatballavpur II, Pantihal, Shankarhati I, Shankarhati II, Shialdanga and Maju gram panchayats of Jagatballavpur community development block and Begari, Domjur, Dakshin Jhapardaha, Parbatipur, Rudrapur, Uttar Jhapardaha and Makardah I gram panchayats of Domjur community development block.

Jagatballavpur Assembly constituency is part of No. 27 Sreerampur Lok Sabha constituency.

== Members of the Legislative Assembly ==
| Year | Name | Party |
|---|---|---|
| 1951 | Amritalal Hazra | Indian National Congress |
| 1957 | Brindaban Behari Basu | Forward Bloc (Marxist) |
| 1962 | Satyanarayan Khan | Indian National Congress |
| 1967 | B.B. Bose | Communist Party of India (Marxist) |
| 1969 | Tarapada Dey | Communist Party of India (Marxist) |
| 1971 | Tarapada Dey | Communist Party of India (Marxist) |
| 1972 | Tarapada Dey | Communist Party of India (Marxist) |
| 1977 | M. Ansaruddin | Communist Party of India (Marxist) |
| 1982 | M. Ansaruddin | Communist Party of India (Marxist) |
| 1987 | M. Ansaruddin | Communist Party of India (Marxist) |
| 1991 | M. Ansaruddin | Communist Party of India (Marxist) |
| 1996 | M. Ansaruddin | Communist Party of India (Marxist) |
| 2001 | Biman Chakraborty | Trinamool Congress |
| 2006 | Biplab Majumdar | Communist Party of India (Marxist) |
| 2011 | Abul Kasem Molla | Trinamool Congress |
| 2016 | Muhammad Abdul Ghani | Trinamool Congress |
| 2021 | Sitanath Ghosh | Trinamool Congress |
| 2026 | Anupam Ghosh | Bharatiya Janata Party |

== Election results ==
=== 2026 ===
2026 West Bengal Legislative Assembly election: Jagatballavpur
| Party | Candidate | Votes | % | ±% |
|---|---|---|---|---|
| BJP | Anupam Ghosh | 115,608 | 45.78 | ▲8.72 |
| AITC | Subir Chatterjee | 108,937 | 43.14 | ▼6.31 |
| AISF | Nazira Khatun | 20,896 | 8.28 | ▼2.48 |
| NOTA | None of the above | 2,199 | 0.87 | ▼0.3 |
| Majority | | 6,671 | 2.64 | ▼9.75 |
| Turnout | | 252,515 | 93.23 | ▲11.43 |
| BJP gain from AITC | | Swing | | |

=== 2021 ===
2021 West Bengal Legislative Assembly election: Jagatballavpur
| Party | Candidate | Votes | % | ±% |
|---|---|---|---|---|
| AITC | Sitanath Ghosh | 116,562 | 49.45 | ▲0.75 |
| BJP | Anupam Ghosh | 87,366 | 37.06 | ▲27.6 |
| AISF | Sheikh Sabbir Ahmed | 25,362 | 10.76 | New entry |
| NOTA | None of the above | 2,769 | 1.17 | ▲0.06 |
| Majority | | 29,196 | 12.39 | ▲0.76 |
| Turnout | | 235,721 | 81.8 | ▼1.05 |
| AITC hold | | Swing | | |

=== 2016 ===
2016 West Bengal Legislative Assembly election: Jagatballavpur
| Party | Candidate | Votes | % | ±% |
|---|---|---|---|---|
| AITC | Muhammad Abdul Ghani | 103,348 | 48.70 | ▼5.49 |
| CPI(M) | Baidyanath Basu | 78,667 | 37.07 | ▼2.44 |
| BJP | Kaushik Mukherjee | 20,065 | 9.46 | ▲6.52 |
| NOTA | None of the above | 2,345 | 1.11 | New entry |
| Majority | | 24,681 | 11.63 | ▼3.05 |
| Turnout | | 2,12,212 | 82.85 | ▼1.06 |
| AITC hold | | Swing | | |

=== 2011 ===
2011 West Bengal Legislative Assembly election: Jagatballavpur
| Party | Candidate | Votes | % | ±% |
|---|---|---|---|---|
| AITC | Abul Kasem Molla | 102,580 | 54.19 | |
| CPI(M) | Kaji Jaffar Ahmed | 74,800 | 39.51 | |
| BJP | Baij Nath Sha | 5,561 | 2.94 | |
| PDCI | Mohammad Monjurul Hoque Syed | 2,180 | 1.15 | |
| Independent | Shankari Makhal | 1,981 | 1.05 | |
| Independent | Nil Ratan Ram | 948 | 0.50 | |
| IUC | Gobardhan Manna | 811 | 0.43 | |
| Independent | Abul Kasem Khondakar | 450 | 0.24 | |
| Majority | | 27,780 | 14.68 | |
| Turnout | | 1,89,311 | 83.91 | |
| AITC gain from CPI(M) | | Swing | 15.41 | |

=== 1977-2006 ===
In the 2006 state assembly elections Biplab Majumdar of CPI(M) won in the Jagatballavpur seat defeating his nearest rival Biman Chakraborty of Trinamool Congress. Contests in most years were multi cornered but only winners and runners are being mentioned. In the 2001 elections Biman Chakraborty of Trinamool Congress defeated M. Ansaruddin of CPI(M). M. Ansaruddin of CPI(M) defeated Nityananda Maity of Congress in 1996, Pulak Sarkar of Congress in 1991, Binodananda Banerjee of Congress in 1987, Nemai Porel, Independent in 1982 and Brindaban Ghosh of Congress in 1977.

=== 1951-1972 ===
Tarapada Dey of CPI(M) won in 1972, 1971 and 1969. B.B.Bose of CPI(M) won in 1967. Satyanarayan Khan of Congress won in 1962. Brindaban Behari Basu of Forward Bloc (Marxist) won in 1957. Amrita Lal Hazra of Congress won in 1951.
