= Raju Karmakar =

Indian politician

Member of the West Bengal Legislative Assembly
- Incumbent
- Assumed office 4 May 2026
- Preceded by: Chandana Sarkar
- Constituency: Baisnabnagar

Personal details
- Party: Bharatiya Janata Party
- Profession: Politician

Raju Karmakar is an Indian politician and member of the Bharatiya Janata Party. He was elected as a Member of the West Bengal Legislative Assembly from the Baisnabnagar constituency in the 2026 West Bengal Legislative Assembly election.
