= Malda Lok Sabha constituency =

Former constituency of the Indian parliament in West Bengal

Coordinates: 25°02′N 88°08′E

Malda
- Former Lok Sabha constituency

Constituency details
- Country: India
- Region: East India
- State: West Bengal
- Assembly constituencies: As in 2004: Habibpur (ST); Araidanga; Malda (SC); Englishbazar; Manikchak; Suzapur; Kaliachak
- Established: 1951
- Abolished: 2009
- Reservation: None

Malda Lok Sabha constituency was one of the 543 parliamentary constituencies in India. The constituency centred on Malda in West Bengal, which was abolished following the delimitation of the parliamentary constituencies in 2008. This seat was a very strong bastion of the Indian National Congress.

== Assembly segments ==
Malda Lok Sabha constituency was composed of the following assembly segments:

- Habibpur (ST) (assembly constituency no. 39)
- Araidanga (assembly constituency no. 44)
- Malda (SC) (assembly constituency no. 45)
- Englishbazar (assembly constituency no. 46)
- Manikchak (assembly constituency no. 47)
- Suzapur (assembly constituency no. 48)
- Kaliachak (assembly constituency no. 49)

As per order of the Delimitation Commission in respect of the delimitation of constituencies in the West Bengal, Malda parliamentary constituency will cease to exist and current constituent assembly segments will be part of either of the two new ones: Maldaha Uttar Lok Sabha constituency or Maldaha Dakshin Lok Sabha constituency.

== Members of Parliament ==
Election Year	MLA	Party
1952	Surendra Mohan Ghose	Indian National Congress
1957	Renuka Ray	Indian National Congress
1962	Renuka Ray	Indian National Congress
1967	Uma Roy	Indian National Congress
1971	Dinesh Chandra Joarder	Communist Party of India (Marxist)
1977	Dinesh Chandra Joarder	Communist Party of India (Marxist)
1980	A. B. A. Ghani Khan Choudhury	Indian National Congress
1984	A. B. A. Ghani Khan Choudhury	Indian National Congress
1989	A. B. A. Ghani Khan Choudhury	Indian National Congress
1991	A. B. A. Ghani Khan Choudhury	Indian National Congress
1996	A. B. A. Ghani Khan Choudhury	Indian National Congress
1998	A. B. A. Ghani Khan Choudhury	Indian National Congress
1999	A. B. A. Ghani Khan Choudhury	Indian National Congress
2004	A. B. A. Ghani Khan Choudhury	Indian National Congress
2006^	Abu Hasem Khan Choudhury	Indian National Congress

For MPs from the area in subsequent years see Maldaha Uttar Lok Sabha constituency and Maldaha Dakshin Lok Sabha constituency

== Election results ==
=== By-election 2006 ===
A by-election was held in this constituency on 13 September 2006 which was necessitated by the death of sitting MP A B A Ghani Khan Choudhury. In the by-election, Abu Hasem Khan Choudhury of Congress defeated his nearest rival Sailen Sarkar of CPI(M) by 84,391 votes.

Indian Parliamentary bye election, 2006: Malda constituency
Party	Candidate	Votes	%	±%
INC	Abu Hasem Khan Choudhury	437,161	50.67	+1.87
CPI(M)	Sailen Sarkar	353,770	41.00	+5.20
BJP	Biswapriya Roy Chowdhury	45,737	5.30	−5.00
Independent	Atul Chandra Mandal	13,875	1.61	
Independent	Ataur Rahman	12,328	1.42	
Majority		84,391		
Turnout		862,888	77.5%	
INC hold		Swing		

=== General election 2004 ===
2004 Indian general election: Malda
Party	Candidate	Votes	%	±%
INC	A B A Ghani Khan Choudhury	412,913	48.80	▲8.58
CPI(M)	Pranab Das	301,805	35.80	▼1.39
BJP	Badsha Alam	86,525	10.30	▼11.00
Independent	Sadhan Chatterjee	18,813	2.20	N/A
Independent	Tushar Kanti Besra	5,748	0.70	N/A
Independent	Majedur Rahaman	5,496	0.70	N/A
BSP	Lawrence Hansda	5,364	0.60	New entry
Independent	Parimal Mardi	5,283	0.60	N/A
Independent	Atul Chandra Mandal	3,794	0.40	N/A
Independent	Naresh Rishi	3,370	0.40	N/A
Majority		111,108	13.20	▲10.17
Turnout		844,032	77.60	
INC hold		Swing		

=== General Election, 1999 ===
1999 Indian general election: Malda
Party	Candidate	Votes	%	±%
INC	A. B. A. Ghani Khan Choudhury	325,833	40.22	▼2.20
CPI(M)	Sailen Sarkar	301,280	37.19	▲0.67
BJP	Muzaffar Khan	172,575	21.30	▲0.97
JMM	Budhrai Kisku	2,928	0.36	New entry
Independent	Biswanath Guha	1,981	0.24	N/A
Independent	Ataur Rahaman	1,228	0.15	N/A
Independent	Nani Gopal Sarkar	1,027	0.13	N/A
IUML	Md. Nekmuddin	872	0.11	New entry
Independent	Aanjur Islam	790	0.10	N/A
Independent	Helarious Mardi	630	0.08	N/A
Independent	Dr. Libias Mondal	630	0.08	N/A
JD(S)	Ahejuddin Khan	422	0.05	New entry
Majority		24,553	3.03	▼2.86
Turnout		8,10,196		
INC hold		Swing		

=== General Election, 1998 ===
1998 Indian general election: Malda
Party	Candidate	Votes	%	±%
INC	A. B. A. Ghani Khan Choudhury	353,117	42.42	▼6.36
CPI(M)	Jiban Maitra	304,035	36.52	▼1.77
BJP	Muzaffar Khan	169,260	20.33	▲9.90
BSP	Mahendra Nath Hasda	4,224	0.51	New entry
Independent	Mazizur Rahaman	919	0.11	N/A
Independent	Akbar Hossain	914	0.11	N/A
Majority		49,082	5.89	▼4.60
Turnout		8,32,469		
INC hold		Swing		

=== General Election, 1996 ===
1996 Indian general election: Malda
Party	Candidate	Votes	%	±%
INC	A. B. A. Ghani Khan Choudhury	417,427	48.78	
CPI(M)	Sailen Sarkar	327,605	38.29	
BJP	Binay Sarkar	89,255	10.43	
Independent	Basu Sant Kumar	6,657	0.78	N/A
Independent	Agu Nasar Khan Choudhury	3,317	0.39	N/A
Independent	Aminul Islam	2,728	0.32	N/A
Independent	Abdus Samad Choudhury	2,231	0.26	N/A
Independent	Md. Nekmuddin	2,024	0.24	N/A
Independent	Birendra N. Biswas	1,329	0.16	N/A
Independent	Ali Saber	1,239	0.14	N/A
Independent	Ainal	797	0.09	N/A
Independent	Naresh Ch. Rishi	664	0.08	N/A
Independent	Nirmal Das	391	0.05	N/A
Majority		89,822	10.49	
Turnout		8,55,664		
INC hold		Swing		

=== General Election, 1991 ===
1991 Indian general election: Malda
Party	Candidate	Votes	%	±%
INC	A. B. A. Ghani Khan Choudhury	291,835	41.14	
CPI(M)	Sailen Sarkar	290,015	40.89	
BJP	Binay Bhusan Sarkar	117,382	16.55	
BSP	Birendra Nath Viswas	7,733	1.09	
IUML	Md. Solaiman	2,342	0.33	
Majority		1,820	0.25	
Turnout		7,09,307		
INC hold		Swing		

=== General Election, 1989 ===
1989 Indian general election: Malda
Party	Candidate	Votes	%	±%
INC	A. B. A. Ghani Khan Choudhury	349,138	48.18	
CPI(M)	Sunil Sen	319,241	44.06	
BJP	Benay Bhusan Sarkar	45,303	6.25	
IUML	Md. Saidul Islam	7,660	1.06	
Independent	Samsuddin Biswas	3,290	0.45	N/A
Majority		29,897	4.12	
Turnout		7,24,632		
INC hold		Swing		

=== General Election, 1984 ===
1984 Indian general election: Malda
Party	Candidate	Votes	%	±%
INC	A. B. A. Ghani Khan Choudhury	304,963	51.92	
CPI(M)	Dinesh Joardar	258,337	43.98	
BJP	Tushar Kanti Ghosh	10,572	1.80	
Independent	Biswa Nath Guha	5,794	0.99	N/A
Independent	Prabodh Kumar Das	3,311	0.56	N/A
IUML	Saidul	2,039	0.35	
Independent	Narayan Kumar Agarwal	1,410	0.24	N/A
Independent	Bijoy Sarkar	929	0.16	N/A
Majority		46,626	7.94	
Turnout		5,97,612	83.35	
INC hold		Swing		

=== General Election, 1980 ===
1980 Indian general election: Malda
Party	Candidate	Votes	%	±%
INC(I)	A. B. A. Ghani Khan Choudhury	251,952	51.30	
CPI(M)	Dinesh Chandra Joarder	239,193	48.70	
Majority		12,759	2.60	
Turnout		5,03,253	75.54	
INC(I) gain from CPI(M)		Swing		

=== General Election, 1977 ===
1977 Indian general election: Malda
Party	Candidate	Votes	%	±%
CPI(M)	Dinesh Chandra Joardar	188,103	52.40	
INC	Pranab Kumar Mukherjee	158,395	44.13	
Independent	Ganour Harijan	8,809	2.45	N/A
Independent	Sarkar Suresh Chandra	2,649	0.74	N/A
Independent	Krishna Kripal Satiar	1,009	0.28	N/A
Majority		29,708	8.27	
Turnout		3,58,965		
CPI(M) hold		Swing		

=== General Election, 1971 ===
1971 Indian general election: Malda
Party	Candidate	Votes	%	±%
CPI(M)	Dinesh Chandra Joarder	137,071	41.94	
INC	Uma Roy	103,305	31.61	
INC(O)	Azimuddin Sarker	53,289	16.30	
CPI	Seikh Siddique	33,185	10.15	
Majority		33,766	10.33	
Turnout		3,40,623	69.11	
CPI(M) gain from INC		Swing		

=== General Election, 1967 ===
1967 Indian general election: Malda
Party	Candidate	Votes	%	±%
INC	U. Roy	123,105	41.68	
Independent	S. K. Misra	95,356	32.29	
CPI	S. Roy	48,254	16.34	
SWA	H. M. A. Sattar	24,288	8.22	
Independent	M. A. H. Alhaj	4,330	1.47	N/A
Majority		27,749	9.39	
Turnout		3,08,145	68.01	
INC hold		Swing		

=== General Election, 1962 ===
1962 Indian general election: Malda
Party	Candidate	Votes	%	±%
INC	Renuka Ray	101,336	43.74	
Independent	Haji Abdus Sattar	65,515	28.28	
SWA	Atul Chandra Kumar	64,841	27.99	
Majority		35,821	15.45	
Turnout		2,43,644	52.52	
INC hold		Swing		

=== General Election, 1957 ===
1957 Indian general election: Malda
Party	Candidate	Votes	%	±%
INC	Renuka Ray	97,217	46.47	
Independent	S. Rahaman	59,951	28.66	
HM	Hariprasanna Misra	23,184	11.08	
Independent	Dwijendra Nath Singha	20,520	9.81	N/A
Independent	Debendra Nath Jha	8,331	3.98	N/A
Majority		37,266	17.81	
Turnout		2,09,203	51.12	
INC hold		Swing		

=== General Election, 1951 ===
1951 Indian general election: Malda
Party	Candidate	Votes	%	±%
INC	Surendra Mohan Ghose	81,666	56.09	
Independent	Amarendra Krishna Bhaduri	39,733	27.29	
Independent	Atul Chandra Kumar	24,202	16.62	
Majority		41,933	28.80	
Turnout		1,45,601	41.02	
INC win (new seat)				

== See also ==
- Malda
- List of constituencies of the Lok Sabha
