= Surendra Mohan Ghose =

Indian politician

- Born: 22 April 1893; Mymensingh, Bengal Presidency, British India
- Died: 7 September 1976 (aged 83); Delhi, India
- Title: Co-Founder of World Union
- Political party: Indian National Congress
- Spouse: Malvika Kanayalal Desai

Member of Parliament, Lok Sabha
- In office 1952–1957
- Succeeded by: Renuka Ray
- Constituency: Malda, West Bengal

Surendra Mohan Ghose (22 April 1893 – 7 September 1976) was an Indian politician in the Jugantar Party during the time of Indian Independence, and a close associate of Sarat Chandra Basu and Maharaj Trailokyanath Chakraborty. He was elected to the lower House of Parliament the Lok Sabha from Malda, West Bengal as a member of the Indian National Congress. He was a member of the Constituent Assembly of India representing West Bengal. He is also one of the founders of the World Union.
