= Sitanath Ghosh =

Indian politician

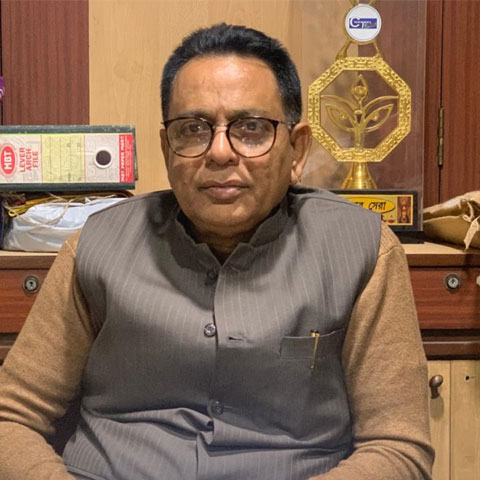

Member of the West Bengal Legislative Assembly
- In office 2 May 2021 – 5 May 2026
- Preceded by: Md. Abdul Ghani
- Succeeded by: Anupam Ghosh
- Constituency: Jagatballavpur

Personal details
- Party: AITC
- Profession: Politician

Sitanath Ghosh, is an Indian politician member of All India Trinamool Congress. He was an MLA, elected from the Jagatballavpur constituency in the 2021 West Bengal Legislative Assembly election. He joined AITC in 1998. From 1998 to 2009, he was a block vice president of Amta AC. From 2002 to 2005, he was district youth vice president. From 2008 to 2015, he was district general secretary. He contested his first election in 2013. He became Zila Parishad member in 2013 and again in 2018.
