= Abu Hasem Khan Choudhury =

Indian politician (1938–2026)

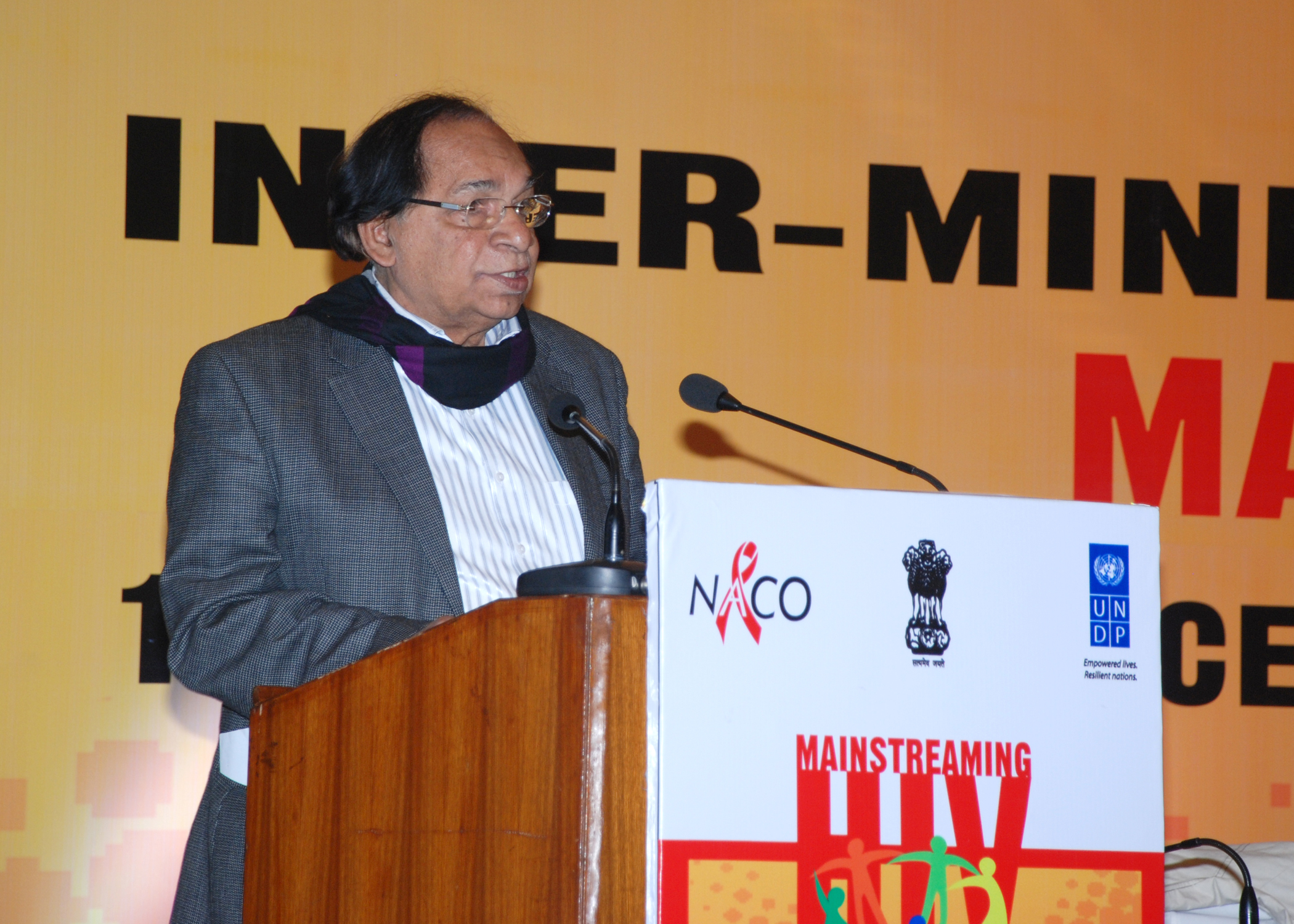
- Chowdhury in 2012

Member of Parliament, Lok Sabha
- In office 16 May 2009 – 4 June 2024
- Preceded by: Constituency established
- Succeeded by: Isha Khan Choudhury
- Constituency: Maldaha Dakshin
- In office 19 September 2006 – 16 May 2009
- Preceded by: A.B.A. Gani Khan Choudhury
- Succeeded by: Constituency abolished
- Constituency: Malda

Union Minister of State for Health and Family Welfare
- In office 22 September 2012 – 16 May 2014
- President: Pranab Mukherjee
- Preceded by: Sudip Bandyopadhyay

Member of West Bengal Legislative Assembly
- In office 10 May 1996 – 11 May 2006
- Preceded by: Dinesh Chandra Joarder
- Succeeded by: Biswanath Ghosh
- Constituency: Kaliachak

Personal details
- Born: 12 January 1938 Malda district, Bengal Province, British India
- Died: 8 April 2026 (aged 88) Kolkata, West Bengal, India
- Party: Indian National Congress
- Spouse: Ruth Khan Choudhury
- Children: Isha Khan Choudhury
- Profession: Political, Social Worker

Abu Hasem Khan Choudhury (12 January 1938 – 8 April 2026), also known as Dalu, was an Indian politician who served as the Union Minister of State for Health and Family Welfare. He has represented the Maldaha Dakshin (Lok Sabha constituency) since 2009. He was first elected M.P from his brother A.B.A. Ghani Khan Choudhury's seat Malda (Lok Sabha constituency) as a member of the Indian National Congress party.

== Early life ==
Abu Hasem Khan Choudhury was born into a Bengali Muslim family in Malda district, Bengal Province. His father, Khan Bahadur Abu Hayat B. Khan Choudhury was a Zamindar in Malda district during the British Raj.

== Political career ==
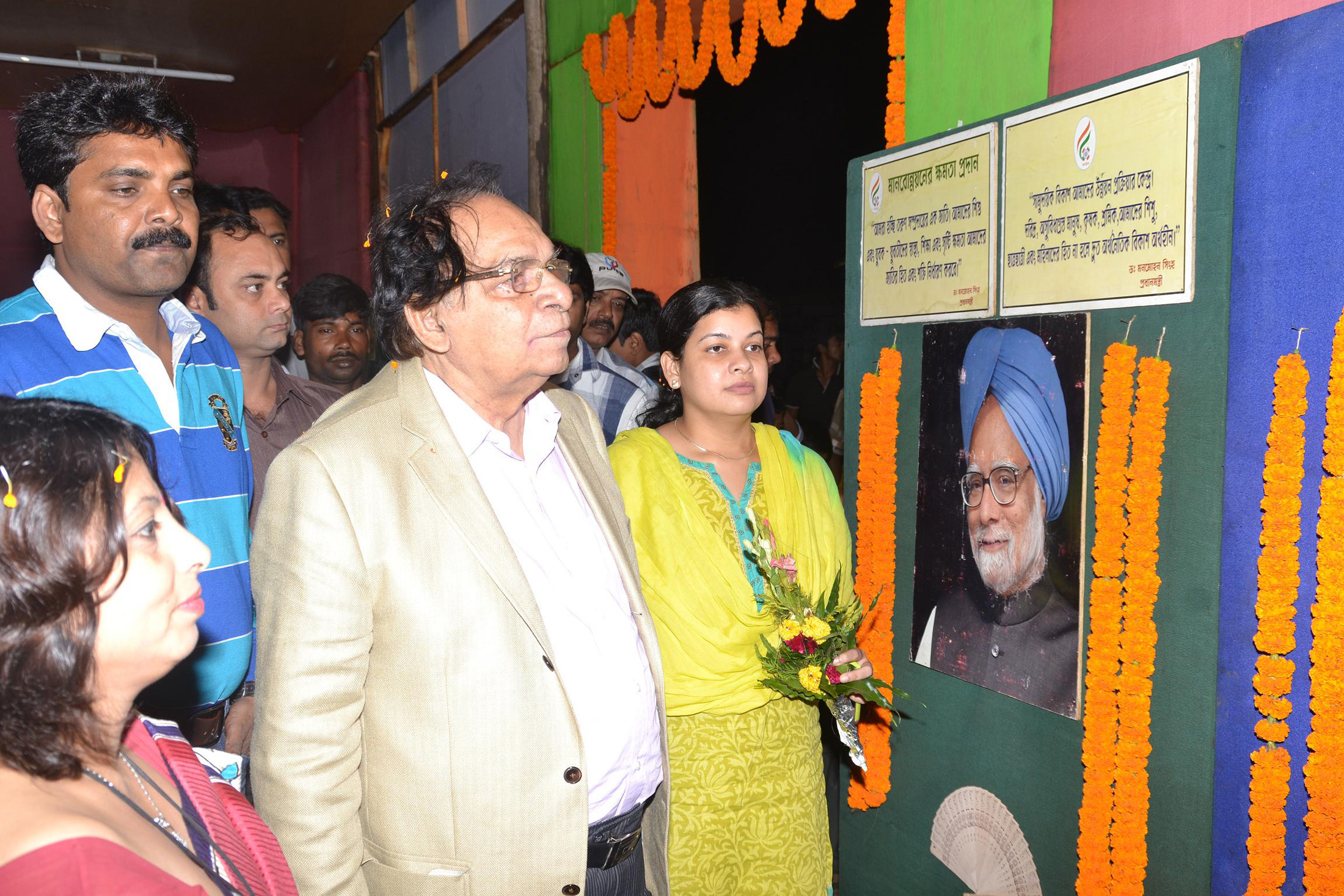
A.H. Khan Choudhury going around the DAVP Photo Exhibition, at the Bharat Nirman Public Information Campaign, in Amrity, Malda, West Bengal on 26 October 2013. The MP, North Malda, Smt. Mausam Benazir Noor is also seen

Choudhury served as MLA of Kaliachak from 1996 to 2006. After his brother A.B.A. Ghani Khan Choudhury's death he was elected M.P. from Malda (Lok Sabha constituency) as a member of the Indian National Congress party. From 22 September 2012 to 16 May 2014 he served as Union Minister of State for Health and Family Welfare under UPA Government.

== Personal life and death ==
Choudhury died at a private hospital in Kolkata, on 8 April 2026, at the age of 88.
