= Shehla Pervin =

Shehla Pervin is an Indian-American breast cancer specialist.

== Biography ==
Pervin obtained her Ph.D. in molecular biology from Jadavpur University in India. She received postdoctoral position at the University of Kentucky and in 2009 was hired by Charles Drew University as an assistant professor. In 2011 she was a guest editor for the Current Pharma Design Journal where she published numerous works regarding her study on breast cancer. Currently she is chairwoman of Radiation Safety Committee and a member of Research Academic Senate. In January 2013 her group proved that vitamin D plays an important role in preventing risk of mammary and breast cancer.

She is currently a professor at California State University, Dominguez Hills
