= Gazole =

Gazole may refer to:

- Gazole (community development block), Malda district, West Bengal
- Gazole Town, census town of Malda district
- Gazole (Vidhan Sabha constituency), West Bengal
- Gazole Mahavidyalaya, a general degree college under University of Gour Banga
- Gazole railway station (GZO), railway station in Malda, West Bengal
