= Alimuddin Ahmad =

Bengali bodybuilder, activist and wrestler

Munshi Syed Alimuddin Ahmad
- সৈয়দ আলীমুদ্দীন আহমদ
- Born: 1884; Dacca, Bengal Presidency
- Died: 1920 (aged 35–36); Calcutta, British India
- Movement: Anti-colonial independence movement

Syed Alimuddin Ahmad (Bengali: সৈয়দ আলীমুদ্দীন আহমদ; 1884–1920), popularly known as Master Saheb (Bengali: মাস্টার সাহেব), was a Bengali bodybuilder and wrestler. He participated in the anti-British independence movement as an underground activist and revolutionary as a part of the Dhaka Mukti Sangha organisation. Ahmed rose to prominence after the organisation was absorbed into Subhas Chandra Bose's Bengal Volunteers during the mayorship of Chittaranjan Das in Calcutta.

== Early life and family ==
Syed Alimuddin Ahmad was born in 1884 to a Bengali Muslim family in Ashiq Jamadar Lane, Dhaka. His father, Syed Amiruddin, was a tailor by profession and owned a small tailoring shop. He and his siblings were educated in the local primary school and then at madrasas, which was why he was often referred to by the titles of Munshi or Moulvi by his comrades. Ahmad then enrolled at Dhaka College. Following his father's death, he started working as a home tutor. Ahmad was a devout Sunni Muslim.

== Activism ==
The start of Ahmad's activism roughly coincided with the 1905 Partition of Bengal movement. As an accomplice of Hemchandra Ghosh, he joined Ghosh's organisation, the Dhaka Mukti Sangha. During World War I, many revolutionaries and activists were arrested, though others, such as Ahmad, continued to keep the organisation alive. Ahmad recruited many young people. Among his notable disciples was Abdul Jabbar. Ahmad continued his anti-imperial activities in hiding to avoid police arrests. The colonial police were never able to capture him.

== Death and legacy ==
Alimuddin Ahmad died of tuberculosis in 1920, which was a major setback for the Mukti Sangha.
