= Mothabari Assembly constituency =

Mothabari
- Constituency No. 52 for the West Bengal Legislative Assembly
- Interactive Map Outlining Mothabari Assembly Constituency

Constituency details
- Country: India
- Region: East India
- State: West Bengal
- District: Malda
- Lok Sabha constituency: Maldaha Dakshin
- Established: 2011
- Total electors: 196,324
- Reservation: None

Member of Legislative Assembly
- 18th West Bengal Legislative Assembly
- Incumbent Md. Najrul Islam
- Party: Democratic Trinamool Congress
- Elected year: 2026

Mothabari Assembly constituency is an assembly constituency in Malda district in the Indian state of West Bengal.

== Overview ==
As per orders of the Delimitation Commission, No. 52 Mothabari Assembly constituency covers Kaliachak II community development block, and Alinagar and Kaliachak I gram panchayats of Kaliachak I community development block.

Mothabari Assembly constituency is part of No. 8 Maldaha Dakshin (Lok Sabha constituency).

== Members of the Legislative Assembly ==
Year	Name	Party
2011	Sabina Yasmin	Indian National Congress
2016	Sabina Yasmin	Indian National Congress
2021	Sabina Yasmin	Trinamool Congress
2026	Md. Najrul Islam	Trinamool Congress

== Election results ==
=== 2026 ===
2026 West Bengal Legislative Assembly election: Mothabari
Party	Candidate	Votes	%	±%
AITC	Mohammad Najrul Islam	65,705	40.51	▼19.19
BJP	Nibaran Ghosh	55,209	34.04	▲9.02
INC	Sayem Chowdhury	27,451	16.93	▲6.57
AISF	Mohammad Sahajahan Ali	9,256	5.71	▲3.51
AIMIM	Mostahid Haque	1,935	1.19	
NOTA	None of the above	1,328	0.82	−0.49
Majority		10,496	6.47	▼28.21
Turnout		162,178	95.63	▲12.53
AITC hold		Swing		

=== 2021 ===
West Bengal assembly elections, 2021: Mothabari constituency
Party	Candidate	Votes	%	±%
AITC	Sabina Yeasmin	97,397	59.7	
BJP	Shyam Chand Ghosh	40,824	25.02	
INC	Dulal Sheikh	16,903	10.36	
AISF	Mohammad Ali Kalimullah	3,585	2.2	
NOTA	None of the above	2,139	1.31	
Majority		56,573	34.68	
Turnout		163,143	83.1	
AITC gain from INC		Swing		

=== 2016 ===
In the 2016 election, Sabina Yasmin of Congress defeated her nearest rival, Md. Najrul Islam of Trinamool Congress.

West Bengal assembly elections, 2016: Mothabari constituency
Party	Candidate	Votes	%	±%
INC	Sabina Yasmin	69,089	51.78	+7.67
AITC	Md. Najrul Islam	30,915	23.17	
BJP	Shyam Chand Ghosh	27,309	20.47	+14.58
NOTA	None of the above	1,859	1.59	
BSP	Dinesh Kumar Jaju	1,123	0.84	
Independent	Anharul Haque	1,061	0.80	
SS	Prem Kumar Ghosh	905	0.68	
Independent	Shyama Pada Saha	584	0.44	
Hindustan Krantikari Dal	Saiyad Samser	578	0.43	
Turnout		133,423	80.13	+0.39
INC hold		Swing		

=== 2011 ===
In the 2011 election, Sabina Yasmin of Congress defeated her nearest rival Naimuddin Sheikh of CPI(M).

West Bengal assembly elections, 2011: Mothabari constituency
Party	Candidate	Votes	%	±%
INC	Sabina Yasmin	47,466	44.11	
CPI(M)	Naimuddin Sheikh	41,446	38.52	
Independent	Shehnaz Quadery	8,505	7.90	
BJP	Nandan Kumar Ghosh	6,340	5.89	
Paschim Banga Rajya Muslim League	Md. Faruque Hossain	1,738		
BSP	Firoj Akhtar	1,070		
CPI(ML)L	Rajab Ali	1,034		
Turnout		107,599	79.74	
INC win (new seat)				

The Independent candidate, Shehnaz Quadery, was a rebel candidate from the family of A. B. A. Ghani Khan Choudhury. Although her name was proposed by the local Congress, she was refused a ticket by the Congress high command.
