= Abul Kasem Molla =

Indian politician

Member of the West Bengal Legislative Assembly
- In office 2011–2016
- Preceded by: Biplab Majumdar
- Succeeded by: Md. Abdul Gani
- Constituency: Jagatballavpur

Personal details
- Party: All India Trinamool Congress

Abul Kasem Molla is an Indian politician associated with the All India Trinamool Congress. He served as a Member of the West Bengal Legislative Assembly from the Jagatballavpur constituency from 2011 to 2016.
