= Masudur Rahman Baidya =

Indian swimmer

Personal information
- Born: 1968 Ballabhpur, North 24 Parganas, West Bengal, India
- Died: 26 April 2015 (aged 46) Kolkata, West Bengal, India

Sport
- Sport: Swimming

Masudur Rahman Baidya (Bengali: মাসুদুর রহমান বৈদ্য) (1968 – 26 April 2015) was an Indian swimmer who was the world's first physically disabled swimmer to swim across the Strait of Gibraltar.

== Biography ==
Masudur Rehman Baidya was born in 1968 at Ballabhpur, North 24 Parganas in West Bengal in a Bengali poor family. His father was an imam of a local mosque. At the age of ten, young Masudur lost both his legs in a train mishap. In the year, 1989, at a swimming event organized by the Artificial Limb Centre at Pune, Masudur came first in sixteen out of seventeen competitions. In spite of his physical disabilities, he came fifth on two other events after this. On the first occasion, he swam from Panihati to Ahiritola in the heart of the Ganges River, flowing through Kolkata; and came fifth. He also stood fifth in an eighty-one kilometers long swimming competition organized in the district of Murshidabad in West Bengal. In 1997, he became the first physically disabled Asian swimmer to successfully cross the English Channel. Followed by this, in the year 2001, he became the world's first physically disabled swimmer to swim across the Strait of Gibraltar. He achieved this feat; by swimming from the Tarifa islands in Spain to shores of Morocco- a total distance of twenty two kilometers- in just about four hours and twenty minutes.

== Death ==
In his later life, Masudur was diagnosed with anemia and owing to his limbs becoming increasingly impaired; he died on 26 April 2015 at a hospital in Kolkata, aged 46.
