= Dinesh Chandra Joarder =

Indian politician (1928–2018)

Member of Parliament
- In office 1971–1980
- Constituency: Malda

MLA
- In office 1987-1996
- Constituency: Kaliachak

Personal details
- Born: 5 August 1928 Malda, British India
- Died: 14 September 2018 (aged 90) Malda, West Bengal, India
- Party: Communist Party of India (Marxist)
- Spouse: Dipali Joarder
- Children: 1 son

Dinesh Chandra Joarder (5 August 1928 – 14 September 2018) was an Indian politician who was a member of Communist Party of India. He was a member of both Lok Sabha and Vidhan Sabha.

== Early life ==
Joarder, son of Jagdish Chander Joarder, was born in Nimbari village in Malda district on 5 August 1928. An advocate by profession, he was educated at A.C. Institute, Malda, Malda College, Malda, Surendranath Law College, Kolkata, and University of Calcutta. He married Dipali Joarder in 1960 and they had a son.

== Political career ==
In 1971, he defeated Uma Roy the sitting MP of Congress to win from Malda (Lok Sabha constituency). In 1977, he defeated the Congress candidate Pranab Mukherjee in the same constituency. He lost to A. B. A. Ghani Khan Choudhury of Congress, however, in 1980. In 1987 and 1991, he won from Kaliachak (Vidhan Sabha constituency).

He was an active political and social worker and was associated with the peasant and trade union movements. He was the president or secretary of many organisations in Malda district. He was a commissioner of the English Bazar municipality from 1964 to 1968.

== Later life and death ==
He was suffering from old age problems for some time and died at his residence in Malda on 14 September 2018. He leaves behind his wife Dipali and son Kaushik.
