= Sujapur Assembly constituency =

West Bengal Legislative Assembly constituency

Sujapur
- Constituency No. 53 for the West Bengal Legislative Assembly
- Interactive Map Outlining Sujapur Assembly Constituency

Constituency details
- Country: India
- Region: East India
- State: West Bengal
- District: Malda
- Lok Sabha constituency: Maldaha Dakshin
- Established: 1957
- Total electors: 251,186
- Reservation: None

Member of Legislative Assembly
- 18th West Bengal Legislative Assembly
- Incumbent Sabina Yeasmin
- Party: DTC
- Elected year: 2026

Sujapur Assembly constituency is an assembly constituency in Malda district in the Indian state of West Bengal.

== Overview ==
As per orders of the Delimitation Commission, No. 53 Sujapur Assembly constituency covers Alipur I, Alipur II, Bamongram Mashimpur, Gayeshbari, Jalalpur, Jalua Badhal, Kalia Chak II, Mozampur, Naoda Jadupur, Silampur I, Silampur II and Sujapur gram panchayats of Kaliachak I community development block.

Sujapur Assembly constituency is part of No. 8 Maldaha Dakshin (Lok Sabha constituency). It was earlier part of Malda (Lok Sabha constituency).

== Members of the Legislative Assembly ==
Year	Member	Party
1957	Manoranjan Mishra	Independent
1962	Ashadulla Choudhury	Indian National Congress
1967	A. B. A. Ghani Khan Choudhury	Indian National Congress
1969	A. B. A. Ghani Khan Choudhury	Indian National Congress
1971	A. B. A. Ghani Khan Choudhury	Indian National Congress
1972	A. B. A. Ghani Khan Choudhury	Indian National Congress
1977	A. B. A. Ghani Khan Choudhury	Indian National Congress
1982	Humayun Chowdhury	Indian National Congress
1987	Humayun Chowdhury	Indian National Congress
1991	Rubi Noor	Indian National Congress
1996	Rubi Noor	Indian National Congress
2001	Rubi Noor	Indian National Congress
2006	Rubi Noor	Indian National Congress
2009^	Mausam Noor	Indian National Congress
2009^	Abu Nasar Khan Choudhury	Indian National Congress
2011	Abu Nasar Khan Choudhury	Indian National Congress
2016	Isha Khan Choudhury	Indian National Congress
2021	Muhammad Abdul Ghani	Trinamool Congress
2026	Sabina Yeasmin	Democratic Trinamool Congress

- ^ by-election

== Election results ==
Vote share of Winning candidates
2026	49.66%
2021	73.44%
2016	58.46%
2011	52.75%
2006	53.46%
2001	53.01%
1996	61.13%
1991	54.00%
1987	44.87%
1982	62.85%
1977	75.22%
1972	70.09%
1971	60.39%
1969	70.36%
1967	75.49%
1962	63.36%
1957	37.12%

=== 2026 ===
2026 West Bengal Legislative Assembly election: Sujapur
Party	Candidate	Votes	%	±%
AITC	Sabina Yeasmin	112,795	49.66	▼23.78
INC	Mohammad Abdul Hannan	52,508	23.12	▲12.39
AISF	Mohammad Karimullah Haque	29,026	12.78	▲7.4
BJP	Abhijit Rajak	20,066	8.83	▲1.71
AIMIM	Monirul islam	4,822	2.12	New entry
Independent	Mohammad Irak Ajam	2,229	0.98	New entry
NOTA	None of the above	952	0.42	▼0.32
Majority		60,287	26.54	▼36.17
Turnout		227,125	96.0	▲13.36
AITC hold		Swing		

=== 2021 ===
In the 2021 election, Md. Abdul Ghani of AITC, defeated his nearest rival, Isha Khan Choudhury of INC

2021 West Bengal Legislative Assembly election: Sujapur
Party	Candidate	Votes	%	±%
AITC	Md Abdul Ghani	152,445	73.44	
INC	Isha Khan Choudhury	22,282	10.73	−47.73
BJP	Sk. Ziauddin	14,789	7.12	+0.88
Indian Secular Front	Md. Nur Islam Sekh	11,173	5.38	
Independent	Md. Rahim Biswas	2,321	1.12	
NOTA	None of the above	1,527	0.74	
Majority		130,163	62.71	
Turnout		207,591	82.64	
AITC gain from INC		Swing		

=== 2016 ===
2016 West Bengal Legislative Assembly election: Sujapur
Party	Candidate	Votes	%	±%
INC	Isha Khan Choudhury	97,332	58.46	
AITC	Abu Naser Khan Choudhury	50,252	30.18	
BJP	Nandan Kumar Ghosh	10,393	6.24	
NOTA	None of the Above	2,542	1.53	
Independent	7 Independent Candidates	4,236	2.54	
Others	5 Other Party Candidates	1,741	1.05	
Majority		47,080	28.28	
Turnout				
INC hold		Swing		

=== 2011 ===
2011 West Bengal Legislative Assembly election: Sujapur
Party	Candidate	Votes	%	±%
INC	Abu Naser Khan Choudhury	70,640	52.75	
CPI(M)	Hazi Ketabuddin	53,279	39.79	
IUML	Md. Ezaruddin	4,788	3.58	
BJP	Tutul Saha	3,429	2.56	
BSP	Abdur Rouf Ansari	1,778	1.33	
Majority		17,361	12.96	
Turnout		133,914	78.14	
INC hold		Swing		

=== 2009 by-election (Jan) ===
2009 West Bengal Legislative Assembly by-election: Sujapur
Party	Candidate	Votes	%	±%
INC	Mausam Noor	74,935	56.52	
CPI	K. Sekh	53,730	40.53	
IND	Sayed Ali	1,310	0.99	
MLKSC	Md. Ezaruddin	1,070	0.81	
IND	Samual Hoque	950	0.72	
IND	Barkat Ali	309	0.23	
IND	Sanjoy Roy	278	0.21	
Majority		21,205	15.99	
Turnout				
INC hold		Swing		

=== 2006 ===
2006 West Bengal Legislative Assembly election: Sujapur
Party	Candidate	Votes	%	±%
INC	Rubi Noor	62,747	53.46	
CPI(M)	Hamidur Rahman	44,891	38.25	
AITC	Biswas Shah Mohammad	2,858	2.43	
BSP	Subhash Chandra Das	1,913	1.63	
Independent	Sukumar Das	1,699	1.45	
IUML	Md. Faruque Hossain	1,446	1.23	
JD(S)	Manjur Alahi Munshi	1,361	1.16	
Majority		17,856	15.21	
Turnout		117,376		
INC hold		Swing		

=== 2001 ===
2001 West Bengal Legislative Assembly election: Sujapur
Party	Candidate	Votes	%	±%
INC	Rubi Noor	54,836	53.01	
CPI(M)	Abdur Rauf	43,256	41.82	
BJP	Nandan Ghosh	2,670	2.58	
CPI(ML)L	Biswas Lutfur Rahaman	1,435	1.39	
SP	Manjur Ali Munshi	1,238	1.20	
Majority		11,580	11.19	
Turnout		103,471	76.50	
INC hold		Swing		

=== 1996 ===
1996 West Bengal Legislative Assembly election: Sujapur
Party	Candidate	Votes	%	±%
INC	Rubi Noor	69,826	61.13	
CPI(M)	Abdur Rauf	36,673	32.11	
BJP	Anadi Saha	3,247	2.84	
CPI(ML)L	Lutfur Rahaman	1,954	1.71	
Independent	Md. Faruque Hossain	1,727	1.51	
Independent	Md. Shamsul Haque	473	0.41	
Independent	Ali Nur Mohammad	320	0.28	
Majority		33,153	29.02	
Turnout		116,636	88.39	
INC hold		Swing		

=== 1991 ===
1991 West Bengal Legislative Assembly election: Sujapur
Party	Candidate	Votes	%	±%
INC	Rubi Noor	49,458	54.00	
CPI(M)	Kousar Ali	31,733	34.65	
BJP	Sripati Saha	7,102	7.75	
IPF	Sk. Moihhammel	1,673	1.83	
IUML	Seikh Esaruddin	1,428	1.56	
Independent	Taslim	196	0.21	
Majority		17,725	19.35	
Turnout		93,725	77.78	
INC hold		Swing		

=== 1987 ===
1987 West Bengal Legislative Assembly election: Sujapur
Party	Candidate	Votes	%	±%
INC	Humayun Chowdhury	33,551	44.87	
CPI(M)	Kowsar Ali	29,345	39.25	
IUML	Abdul Quddus	10,059	13.45	
Independent	Jahangir	1,812	2.42	
Majority		4,206	5.62	
Turnout		75,713	78.00	
INC hold		Swing		

=== 1982 ===
1982 West Bengal Legislative Assembly election: Sujapur
Party	Candidate	Votes	%	±%
INC	Humayun Chowdhury	42,530	62.85	
CPI(M)	Mamtaz Begum	24,139	35.67	
Independent	Md. Mahidur Rahaman Mia	998	1.47	
Majority		18,391	27.18	
Turnout		68,583	77.75	
INC hold		Swing		

=== 1977 ===
1977 West Bengal Legislative Assembly election: Sujapur
Party	Candidate	Votes	%	±%
INC	A. B. A. Ghani Khan Choudhury	43,569	75.22	
CPI(M)	Habibur	9,821	16.96	
JP	Azimul Islam	4,530	7.82	
Majority		33,748	58.26	
Turnout		58,679	70.83	
INC hold		Swing		

=== 1972 ===
1972 West Bengal Legislative Assembly election: Sujapur
Party	Candidate	Votes	%	±%
INC	A. B. A. Ghani Khan Choudhury	32,911	70.09	
Independent	Mannak Sk	9,418	20.06	
IUML	Habibur Rahman	4,623	9.85	
Majority		23,493	50.03	
Turnout		48,107	59.66	
INC hold		Swing		

=== 1971 ===
1971 West Bengal Legislative Assembly election: Sujapur
Party	Candidate	Votes	%	±%
INC	A. B. A. Ghani Khan Choudhury	29,291	60.39	
Independent	Habibur Rahaman	7,584	15.64	
INC(O)	Ananda Mohan De	7,514	15.49	
Independent	Homavam Choedhury	4,116	8.49	
Majority		21,707	44.75	
Turnout		51,096	64.92	
INC hold		Swing		

=== 1969 ===
1969 West Bengal Legislative Assembly election: Sujapur
Party	Candidate	Votes	%	±%
INC	A. B. A. Ghani Khan Choudhury	34,910	70.36	
Bangla Congress	Hazi Taleb Ali Mandal	10,840	21.85	
NDF	Subodh Kumar Misra	3,867	7.79	
Majority		24,070	48.51	
Turnout		50,713	67.89	
INC hold		Swing		

=== 1967 ===
1967 West Bengal Legislative Assembly election: Sujapur
Party	Candidate	Votes	%	±%
INC	A. B. A. Ghani Khan Choudhury	36,809	75.49	
SWA	S. Ahammad	4,099	8.41	
Bangla Congress	H. Ghosh	3,160	6.48	
Independent	N. Singha	1,982	4.07	
Independent	B. Sarkar	1,781	3.65	
Independent	S. Hossain	926	1.90	
Majority		32,710	67.08	
Turnout		51,402	69.35	
INC hold		Swing		

=== 1962 ===
1962 West Bengal Legislative Assembly election: Sujapur
Party	Candidate	Votes	%	±%
INC	Ashadulla Choudhury	18,638	63.36	
SWA	Samjuddin Ahammed	10,779	36.64	
Majority		7,859	26.72	
Turnout		31,046	45.36	
Swing to INC from Independent		Swing		

=== 1957 ===
1957 West Bengal Legislative Assembly election: Sujapur
Party	Candidate	Votes	%	±%
Independent	Monoranjan Misra	11,677	37.12	
Independent	A. B. A. Ghani Khan Choudhury	10,523	33.45	
INC	Mushtaq Ahmed	9,260	29.43	
Majority		1,154	3.67	
Turnout		31,460	50.99	
Independent win (new seat)				
