= Sabina Yeasmin =

Indian politician

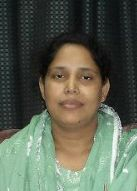

Minister of State, Government of West Bengal
- In office 10 May 2021 – 4 May 2026
- Governor: Jagdeep Dhankhar; La. Ganesan; C. V. Ananda Bose; R. N. Ravi
- Chief Minister: Mamata Banerjee
- Ministry: Irrigation and Waterways; North Bengal Development
- In office 20 May 2011 – September 2012
- Governor: M. K. Narayanan
- Chief Minister: Mamata Banerjee
- Ministry: Security, Counterterrorism and Police
- Succeeded by: Mamata Banerjee

Member of the West Bengal Legislative Assembly
- Incumbent
- Assumed office 4 May 2026
- Preceded by: Md Abdul Ghani
- Constituency: Sujapur
- In office 13 May 2011 – 4 May 2026
- Preceded by: Constituency established
- Succeeded by: Md. Najrul Islam
- Constituency: Mothabari

Deputy Leader of the Opposition in West Bengal
- Incumbent
- Assumed office 3 June 2026 Serving with Sandipan Saha; Javed Ahmed Khan; Seuli Saha

Personal details
- Born: March 17, 1978 (age 48) Karari Chandpur, Malda, West Bengal, India
- Party: Trinamool Congress (2018–2026); Democratic Trinamool Congress (from 2026)
- Other political affiliations: Indian National Congress (until 2018)
- Spouse: Mehebub Alam
- Children: Fizza Alam, Naurin Alam
- Education: North Bengal University (B.A.)

Sabina Yeasmin (born 17 March 1978) is an Indian politician who served as Minister of State for Irrigation and Waterways, North Bengal Development in the Government of West Bengal. She is an MLA, elected from the Mothabari Assembly constituency in the West Bengal Legislative Assembly.

== Political career ==
She is first Muslim woman minister in Government of West Bengal in the First Mamata Banerjee ministry and current Third Mamata Banerjee ministry. Sabina Yasmin's victory from Mothabari was particularly creditable because Shehnaz Quadery, a niece of A. B. A. Ghani Khan Choudhury contested the seat as an independent candidate. She was one of the seven Muslim woman MLAs in the West Bengal Legislative Assembly. She resigned as a minister when the Congress party decided to pull out of the Mamata Banerjee government. In 2018 she joined Trinamool Congress.

== Zilla Parishad ==
Sabina was Sabhadipati of Malda Zilla Parishad before contesting the assembly elections. In 2008, she won a seat in the Malda Zilla Parishad from Kaliachak – I.

== Personal life ==
She graduated from Gour Mahavidyalaya in 2000 and completed her post-graduation from University of North Bengal in 2002.
