= Kazi Masum Akhtar =

Indian educationist (born 1971)

Kazi Masum Akhtar (born 1971) is an educationist from West Bengal, India. In 2020, he was conferred the Padma Shri India's fourth highest civilian award by the Government of India for his contribution to the field of literature. He is the headmaster in the Talpukur Ara High Madarsah near Kolkata, West Bengal. He was beaten up by radical Muslim clerics for asking students of his Madarsah to sing the Indian National anthem on Indian Republic Day

== Awards ==
- Padma Shri, 2020
