= Isha Khan Choudhury =

Indian politician (born 1971)

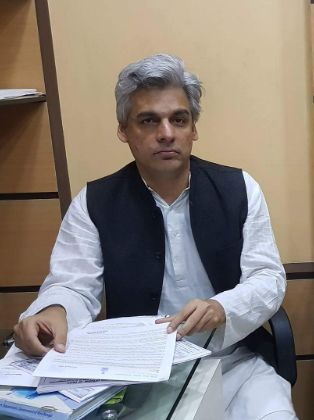

Member of Parliament, Lok Sabha
- Incumbent
- Assumed office 4 June 2024
- Preceded by: Abu Hasem Khan Choudhury
- Constituency: Maldaha Dakshin

Member of the West Bengal Legislative Assembly
- In office 25 May 2016 – 2 May 2021
- Preceded by: Abu Nasar Khan Choudhury
- Succeeded by: Muhammad Abdul Ghani
- Constituency: Sujapur
- In office 10 May 2011 – 25 May 2016
- Preceded by: Position established
- Succeeded by: Swadhin Kumar Sarkar
- Constituency: Baisnabnagar

Personal details
- Born: 22 May 1971 (age 55) Malda, West Bengal, India
- Party: Indian National Congress
- Spouse: Sayeda Saleha Noor
- Relations: A.B.A. Ghani Khan Choudhury (uncle); Abu Nasar Khan Choudhury (uncle); Rubi Noor (aunt); Mausam Noor (cousin)
- Parent: Abu Hasem Khan Choudhury (father)
- Education: York University (B.A.)

Isha Khan Choudhury (born 22 May 1971) is an Indian politician from the state of West Bengal and a Member of Parliament, Lok Sabha representing Maldaha Dakshin constituency. He represented the Sujapur constituency in the West Bengal Legislative Assembly as a candidate of the Indian National Congress party. He comes from a political family with his father and uncle being former cabinet ministers in the central government.

== Personal life ==
Khan Choudhury spent the early years of his life in Canada. His Bengali Muslim father is Abu Hasem Khan Choudhury. He has two uncles, A.B.A. Ghani Khan Choudhury and Abu Nasar Khan Choudhury. His cousin Mausam Noor (daughter of Ghani Khan Choudhury's sister) was a Member of Indian Parliament. All of them are members of the Indian National Congress except Abu Nasar who defected to the Trinamool Congress party. The Khan Choudhury brothers are former cabinet ministers in the central government.

== Political career ==
In the 2011 West Bengal Assembly election, Khan Choudhury emerged victorious from the Baishnabnagar constituency as a candidate of the Indian National Congress party. In the election, he defeated candidate fielded by the Communist Party of India (Marxist). In the 2016 West Bengal Assembly election, he contested from the Sujapur constituency. He said that he took this decision "on the direction of the party high command". He was pitted against his own uncle Abu Nasar who switched to the Trinamool Congress party. During his election campaign he said that his uncle did not work for the benefit of the citizens and hence claimed that they were therefore supporting the Congress party. In the election, he defeated his uncle after he secured 97 thousand votes compared to his uncle's 50 thousand votes.
