= Mausam Noor =

Indian politician (born 1979)

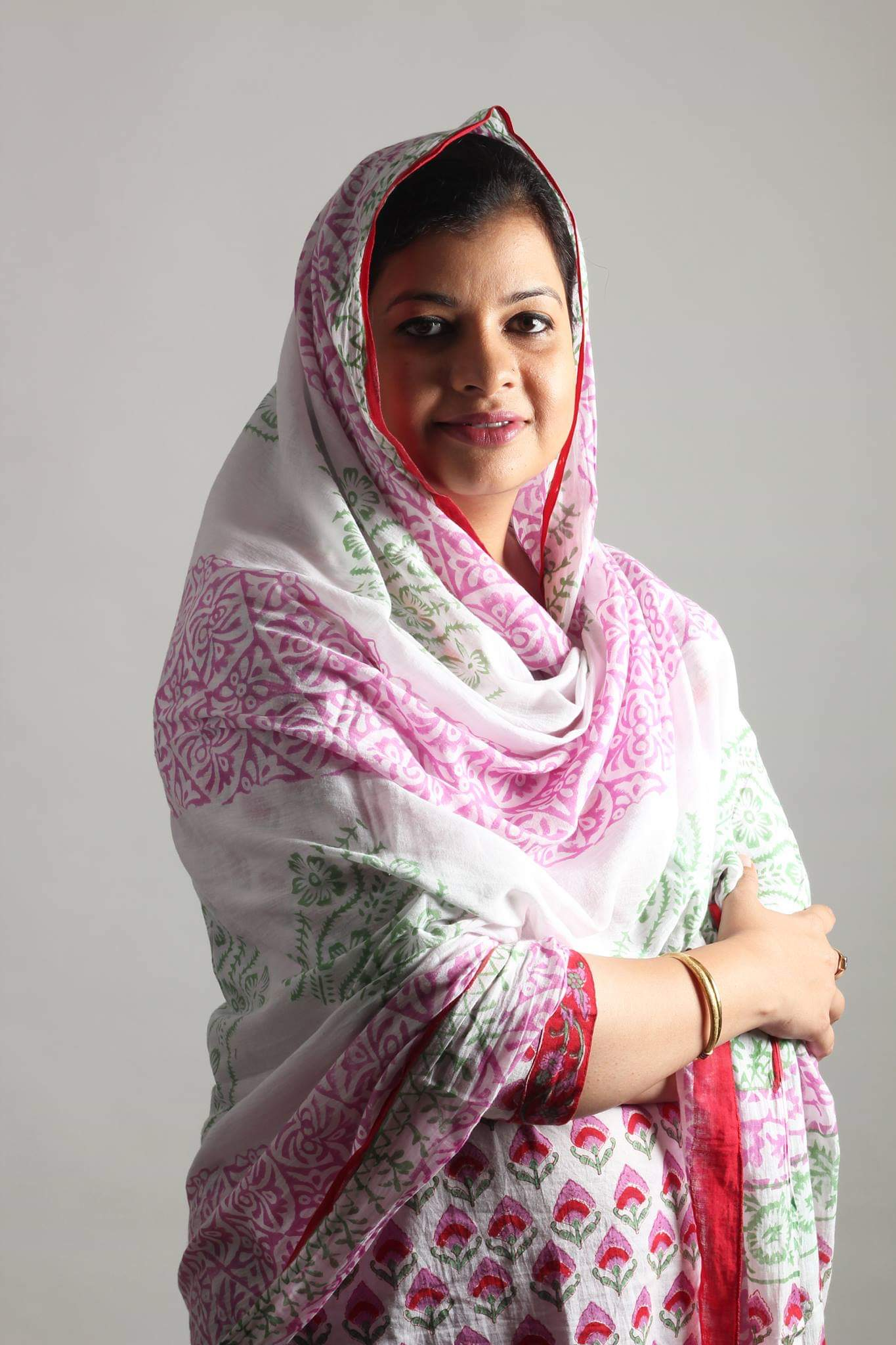

Member of Parliament, Rajya Sabha
- In office 3 April 2020 – 5 January 2026
- Succeeded by: Menaka Guruswamy
- Constituency: West Bengal

Vice Chairperson of West Bengal Commission for Women
- Incumbent
- Assumed office 2019
- Chairperson: Leena Gangopadhyay
- Preceded by: Mahua Panja

Member of Parliament, Lok Sabha
- In office 20 May 2009 – 23 May 2019
- Preceded by: New constituency
- Succeeded by: Khagen Murmu
- Constituency: Maldaha Uttar

Member of Legislative Assembly, West Bengal
- In office 17 January 2009 – 16 May 2009
- Preceded by: Rubi Noor
- Succeeded by: Abu Nasar Khan Choudhury
- Constituency: Sujapur

Personal details
- Born: 15 October 1979 (age 46) Kolkata, West Bengal, India
- Party: Indian National Congress (2009–2019, 2026–present)
- Other political affiliations: Trinamool Congress (2019–2026)
- Spouse: Mirza Kayesh Begg (m. 2009)
- Children: 2
- Parent: Rubi Noor (mother)
- Education: Calcutta University (LL.B.)
- Profession: Advocate
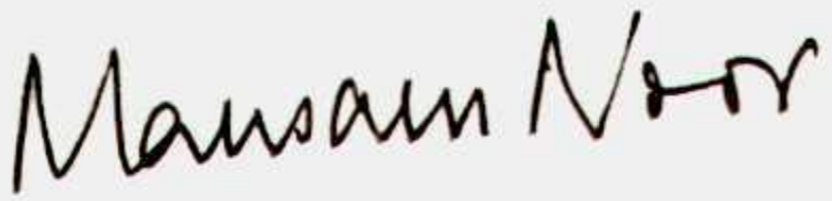
- Signature

Mausam Benazir Noor (born 15 October 1979) is an Indian politician, who is a former Member of Parliament, Rajya Sabha from West Bengal and Vice Chairperson of West Bengal Commission for Women. She was President of Malda district TMC and a Member of Lok Sabha for Maldaha Uttar from 2009 until 2019.

Noor comes from a political Bengali Muslim family of Malda, West Bengal. Her uncle A. B. A. Ghani Khan Choudhury was Minister of Railways in the Third Indira Gandhi Ministry. She studied at La Martiniere Calcutta and received a law degree from Calcutta University. Mausam entered politics after her mother Rubi Noor (the then incumbent Member of Legislative Assembly of West Bengal for Sujapur constituency) died in 2008. In early 2009, she was elected to the Legislative Assembly from the same constituency and in May she was elected to the Lok Sabha. Noor was elected president of the West Bengal Youth Congress in 2011. Two years later, she was elected president of the Indian National Congress Malda district unit. In January 2019, she switched to Trinamool Congress party after her proposal of an electoral alliance with the party for the 2019 general election was turned down by the Pradesh Congress Committee.

In a significant political move ahead of the 2026 West Bengal assembly polls, Mausam Benazir Noor resigned from the Trinamool Congress (TMC) and officially rejoined the Indian National Congress (INC) on January 3, 2026. The former Rajya Sabha MP and former two-time Lok Sabha member described the return as an emotional "homecoming" aimed at uniting her family to strengthen the legacy of her uncle, the late Congress stalwart A.B.A. Ghani Khan Choudhury. She formally submitted her resignation from the Rajya Sabha shortly after rejoining the party in New Delhi. Her return, alongside her cousin and Malda South MP Isha Khan Choudhury, is seen as a strategic effort to consolidate the Congress's influence in the Malda district and the broader North Bengal region.

== Early and personal life ==
Noor belongs to a political Bengali Muslim family from the Malda district. Her mother, Rubi Noor, was elected to the West Bengal Legislative Assembly for three consecutive terms from the Sujapur constituency. Rubi was married to her classmate and Mausam's father Syed Noor. She accompanied her husband to Canada before entering politics in 1991. Mausam has two elder sisters — Syeda Saleha Noor and Sonya Sarah Noor.

One of Noor's uncles, A. B. A. Ghani Khan Choudhury, served as Minister of Railways in the Third Indira Gandhi ministry. Her other uncle, Abu Hasem Khan Choudhury, is serving as a Member of Parliament for the Maldaha Dakshin constituency. Abu Hasem's son, Isha Khan Choudhury, is a member of the West Bengal Legislative Assembly and represents the Sujapur constituency.

Noor studied at La Martiniere Calcutta and received a law degree from the Calcutta University. She worked at the legal firm Fox and Mandal and practised as a full-time lawyer in the Supreme Court of India for two years before entering politics. She married her long-time boyfriend Mirza Kayesh Begg of Asansol on 5 December 2009. She met him in 2004 while studying law at Calcutta University.

== Political career ==
=== Indian National Congress ===
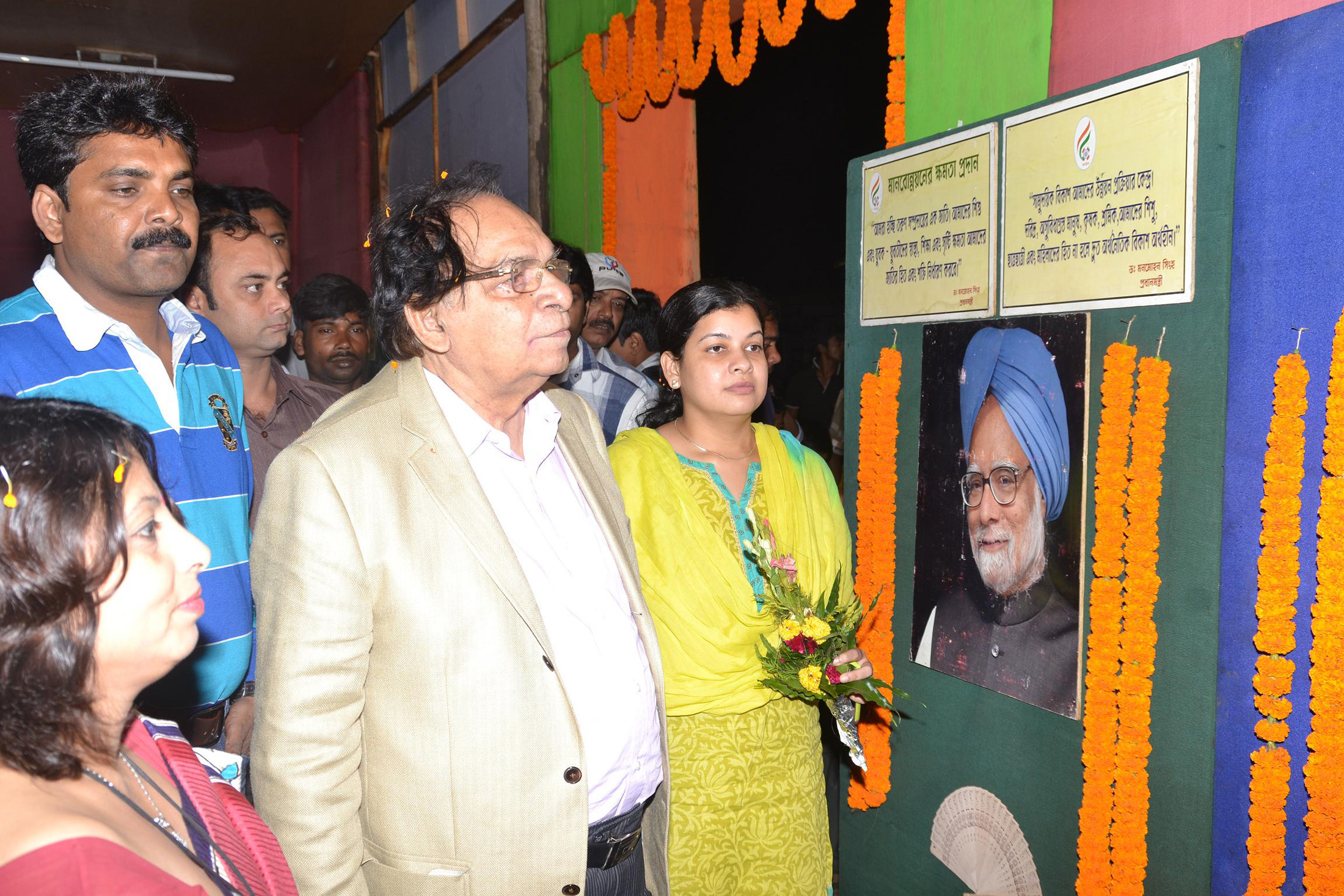
Noor (far right) with her uncle Abu Hasem Khan Choudhury in 2013.

On 10 July 2008, the Sujapur constituency fell vacant due to the death of Noor's mother, sitting Member of Legislative Assembly Rubi Noor. Subsequently, the Indian National Congress party announced that Mausam would contest for the upcoming by-election from the constituency. She won the election and defeated her nearest rival, Haji Ketabuddin of the Communist Party of India (Marxist) by a margin of 21,205 votes.

On 20 May 2009, Noor was elected to the Lok Sabha, representing the Maldaha Uttar constituency. She became one of the five youngest members and the youngest Muslim woman to be elected to the 15th Lok Sabha. On 31 August, she became a member of the Standing Committee on Labour. On 23 September, she became a member of the Standing Committee on Empowerement of Women and a member of Consultative Committee of Ministry of Youth Affairs and Sports.

In March 2011, Noor was elected president of the West Bengal Youth Congress. She was supported by the Indian Youth Congress general-secretary Rahul Gandhi and defeated Arindam Bhattacharya. In December 2013, she succeeded her uncle Abu Hasem Khan Choudhury as the party president for the Malda district.

During Noor's first term as an MP, 1,500 kilometres (930 mi) of road was built in her constituency under the Pradhan Mantri Gram Sadak Yojana. Also, under the Rajiv Gandhi Grameen Vidyutikaran Yojana (Rajiv Gandhi Village Electrification Scheme), ₹1.33 billion was sanctioned for her constituency. Moreover, ₹850 million was sanctioned for the National Highway 81 (running from Gazole to Harishchandrapur), ₹290 million for Ratua-Nakatti Bridge, ₹330 million under Backward Regions Grant Fund to review erosion caused by the Mahananda River and ₹320 million for a Samsi railway overbridge. However, she alleged that these projects could not be implemented as the state government refused to co-operate.

In March 2014, the Congress party announced that Noor would participate from her own constituency for the upcoming general election. She was re-elected after defeating Khagen Murmu of the Communist Party of India (Marxist) by a margin of 65,705 votes. She was polled 388,000 votes. From 1 September 2014 to 31 August 2015, she served as a member of Committee on Papers Laid on the Table and Standing Committee on Rural Development. On 1 September 2014, she also became a member of Consultative Committee, Ministry of Minority Affairs.

Although Malda has been a bastion of the Congress party, they lost a large number of Zilla Parishad elections and Panchayat samiti elections to the ruling Trinamool Congress with Bharatiya Janata Party making inroads in the region. To make amends, Noor started organizing rallies and visiting villages.

Mausam Noor, the Rajya Sabha MP and niece of the legendary Ghani Khan Chowdhury, recently made a significant return to the Indian National Congress on January 3, 2026. This high-profile homecoming occurred just months before her Upper House term was set to expire and ahead of the critical West Bengal Assembly elections. By resigning from the Trinamool Congress (TMC), she expressed a desire to reclaim her family's historic political legacy in Malda, stating that "Bengal needs a change, and let it begin with me." Her return is widely viewed as a strategic reinforcement for Congress, aiming to restore its former dominance in the region.

=== Trinamool Congress ===
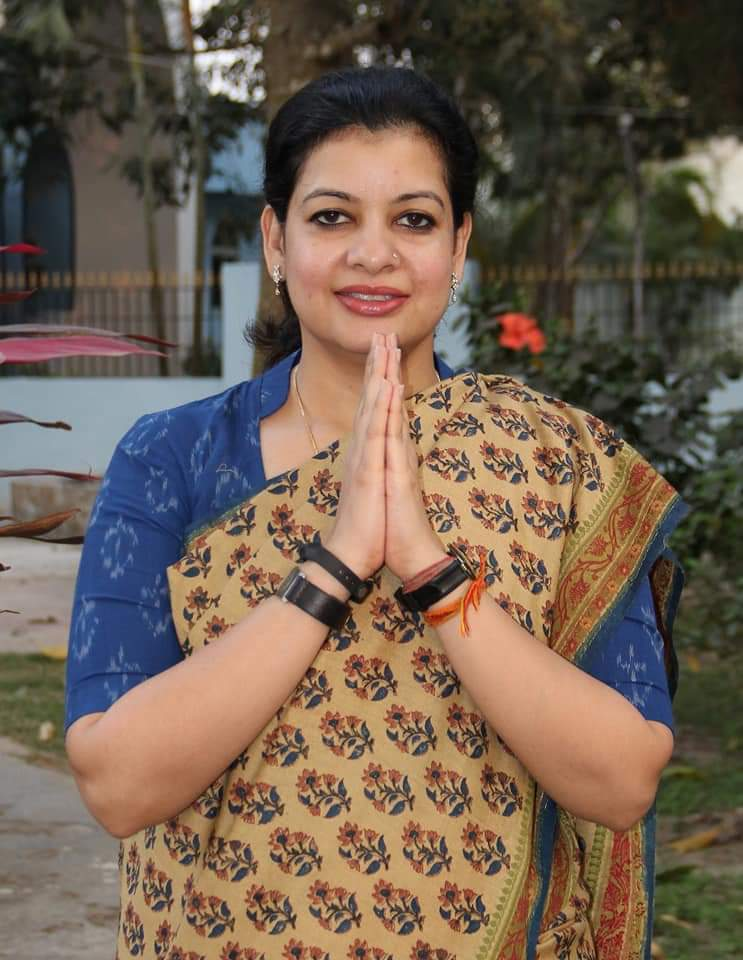
Noor in 2019

Noor left the Congress party and joined the Trinamool Congress on 28 January 2019 after her proposal to form an electoral alliance with the ruling Trinamool Congress was turned down by the Pradesh Congress Committee.

Subsequently, Noor was elevated to the post of the General-Secretary of the party. The party also announced that she would contest from her own constituency (Maldaha Uttar) in the upcoming 2019 general election. She also became the party in-charge for the Uttar Dinajpur, Dakshin Dinajpur and Malda districts. On 30 January, she organized a rally at Malda in which had fourteen panchayat members and one councillor of English Bazaar switch to Trinamool.

In the election, Noor lost to Khagen Murmu of Bharatiya Janata Party, her nearest rival by a margin of 84,288 votes. She was polled 425,236 votes. Subsequently, the party made her the party president of the Malda district unit on 26 May.

In the Rajya Sabha election 2020, Noor was nominated for Rajya Sabha election from West Bengal by the Chief Minister of West Bengal Mamata Banerjee.

In January 2026, Mausam Benazir Noor resigned from the Trinamool Congress (TMC) and rejoined the Indian National Congress, marking a significant shift in West Bengal's political landscape ahead of the state assembly elections. A sitting Rajya Sabha MP for the TMC, she submitted her formal resignation from the Upper House on January 5, 2026, just months before her term was scheduled to expire in April.
