= Abu Nasar Khan Choudhury =

Indian politician (1935–2026)

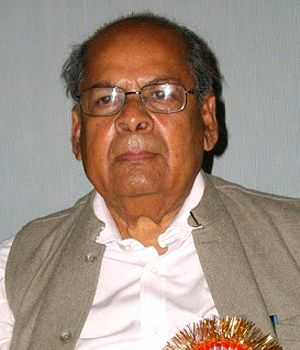

Minister of State for Science and Technology, Government of West Bengal
- In office 20 May 2011 – September 2012

Member of West Bengal Legislative Assembly
- In office 2009–2016
- Preceded by: Mausam Noor
- Succeeded by: Isha Khan Choudhury
- Constituency: Sujapur

Personal details
- Born: 22 October 1935
- Died: 19 November 2026 (aged 91) Kolkata, West Bengal, India
- Party: Indian National Congress
- Education: Malda College; University of Liverpool (Post Graduation); University of Leicester (M.Phil.); University of Zurich (Doct.)

Abu Nasar Khan Choudhury (22 October 1935 – 19 November 2026) was an Indian politician who was the Minister of State for Science and Technology in the Government of West Bengal. He served as an MLA, elected from the Sujapur constituency in the 2011 West Bengal state assembly election.

He resigned from the ministry when Congress withdrew its support to the Mamata Banerjee government in September 2012.

== Education ==
After his matriculation in 1951 and graduation from Malda College in 1956, Choudhury went abroad. He completed his initial postgraduate study from the University of Liverpool in 1965 and an MPhil in 1976 from the University of Leicester, England. He obtained his doctoral degree from the University of Zurich in Switzerland in 1986.
