= Malda College =

College in West Bengal, India

- Type: Undergraduate college Public college
- Established: July 23, 1944; 82 years ago
- Academic affiliations: University of Gour Banga
- Principal: Dr. Manas Kumar Baidya
- Students: 5201
- Location: Malda, West Bengal, India; 25°00′4.98″N 88°08′12.17″E
- Campus: Urban
- Website: www.maldacollege.ac.in
- Location within West Bengal Location within India

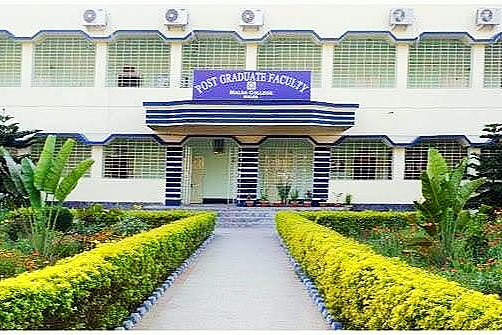

Malda College is a college in English Bazar in the Malda district of West Bengal, India. The college is affiliated to the University of Gour Banga, which offers undergraduate and postgraduate courses in several subjects. Established on July 23, 1944, it is the oldest state-governed college in Malda district.

== History ==
The roots of the college can be traced to a pre-partition temporary college at Dadanchak (presently under Shibganj Police Station in the district of Nawabganj, Bangladesh). In mid-1943, a report was published in one of the popular local newspapers appealing the public of Maldah district to donate in order to establish the estimated fund of 300,000 Rupees, required to change the Dadanchak College's location to Malda. The much-needed land was given by Mr. Jadunandan Choudhury and Mr. Asutosh Choudhury. In a very little time, the people of Malda donated the estimated sum, which helped start the initial work for shifting. On 1 May 1944, the University of Calcutta granted affiliation to Malda College and on 23 July 1944 the college was officially established by the then District Magistrate of English Bazar, Mr. W. H. Saumarez Smith, as an "Intermediate Arts and Commerce College", with eight teachers and 150 students. In the founding phase, the college was affiliated to teach English, Vernacular Bengali, Philosophy, Economics, History, and Sanskrit. In 1952, the college moved from its original rented building at the present-day Atul Market-area, Malda, to a new building at Rathbari More, Malda, in a large compound. Two auditoriums were built in 1994, commemorating the golden jubilee celebrations.

== Location ==
Malda College is located at English Bazar, in the Malda district of West Bengal, India, right on the National Highway 12. The full address of the college (for the purpose of correspondence) is: The Principal, Malda College, Rabindra Avenue, Rathbari More, Post Office + District: Malda, Pin-732101, West Bengal, India.

== Administration ==
The college is administrated by Administrator, currently, Nitin Singhania, IAS and Principal, currently Dr. Manas Kumar Baidya. Bursar of the college is Dr. Arup Roy Choudhury and IQAC coordinator is Dr. Narayan Chandra Shaw.

== Departments ==
Faculties and Departments
Faculty	Departments
Science	Botany, Chemistry, Computer Science, B.C.A., Mathematics, Physics, Zoology
Arts and Commerce	Arabic, Bengali, Commerce, Economics, English, Geography, History, Philosophy, Political Science, Sanskrit, Education, Sociology

Malda College offers three post graduate courses on Bengali, English and History. Malda College is also the study-centre of Netaji Subhas Open University, Kolkata, while the Directorate of Distance Education, University of Burdwan, opened its branch at the college on 8 June 2013.

== Journals ==
Malda College publish UGC approved two journals:

1. Indian Journal of Multidisciplinary Academic Research ISSN 2347-9884

2. Exploring History ISSN 2230-8490

== Accreditation ==
In 2021, the college has been awarded B+ grade by National Assessment and Accreditation Council (NAAC) in 2nd cycle. The college is recognized by the University Grants Commission (UGC).

== Notable alumni ==
- Abu Nasar Khan Choudhury
- Tapan Sikdar

== See also ==
- List of institutions of higher education in West Bengal
- Education in India
- Education in West Bengal
