= A. B. A. Ghani Khan Choudhury =

Indian politician (1927–2006)

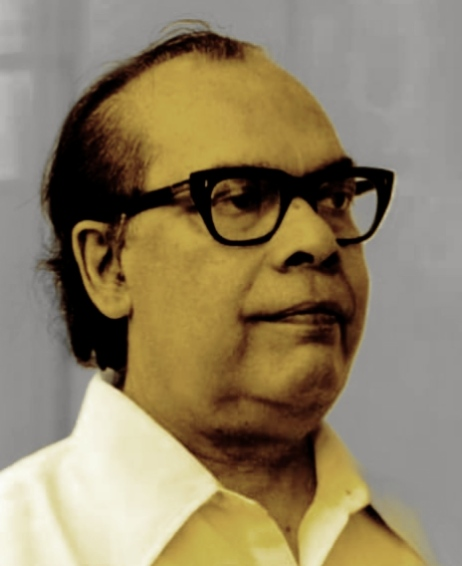

Union Minister of Statistics and Programme Implementation, Government of India
- In office 1985–1987
- Prime Minister: Rajiv Gandhi

Union Minister of Railways, Government of India
- In office 2 September 1982 – 31 December 1984
- Prime Minister: Indira Gandhi
- Preceded by: Prakash Chandra Sethi
- Succeeded by: Bansi Lal

Minister of Coal with Water Resources, River Development and Ganga Rejuvenation & New and Renewable Energy (Independent Charge), Government of India
- In office 1980–1982
- Prime Minister: Indira Gandhi

Member of Parliament, Lok Sabha
- In office 1980–2006
- Preceded by: Dinesh Chandra Joarder
- Succeeded by: Abu Hasem Khan Choudhury
- Constituency: Malda

Minister of Irrigation and Power, Government of West Bengal
- In office 1972–1977

Member of West Bengal Legislative Assembly
- In office 1967–1980
- Preceded by: Ashadulla Choudhury
- Succeeded by: Humayoun Chowdhury
- Constituency: Sujapur

Personal details
- Born: Abu Barkat Ataur Ghani Khan Choudhury; 1 November 1927 Malda, Bengal Presidency, British India
- Died: 14 April 2006 (aged 78) Kolkata, West Bengal, India
- Party: Indian National Congress
- Spouse: Ruth Khan Choudhury
- Relations: Abu Hasem Khan Choudhury (brother); Abu Nasar Khan Choudhury (brother); Rubi Noor (sister); Isha Khan Choudhury (nephew); Mausam Noor (niece)
- Education: University of Calcutta (B.A.)

Abu Barkat Ataur Ghani Khan Choudhury (1 November 1927 – 14 April 2006), known as Barkatda to his supporters, was an Indian politician who served as the 1st Minister of Coal from 1980 to 1982. He is from West Bengal, India. Choudhury was a senior leader of Indian National Congress.

== Political career ==
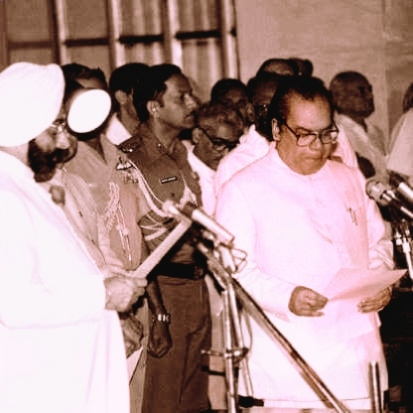
Swearing-in as Railway Minister, 1982

Ghani Khan Choudhury was first elected as an MLA to the West Bengal state legislative assembly in 1957, winning the seat in 1962, 1967, 1971 and 1972. He served as a State Cabinet Minister in the Government of West Bengal from 1972 to 1977. First elected to the 7th Lok Sabha in 1980 from Malda, Choudhury would go on to represent the constituency for eight straight terms, winning again in 1984, 1989, 1991, 1996, 1998, 1999 and 2004. From 1982 to 1984, Choudhury served as the Minister of Railways in Indira Gandhi's and Rajiv Gandhi's governments. He took active part in introducing the Kolkata Metro Railway and Circular Railways in the city of Kolkata, and towards establishing the Malda Town railway station as one of the most important stations of the region.

For his contributions, Choudhury is often respected as the architect of modern Malda.

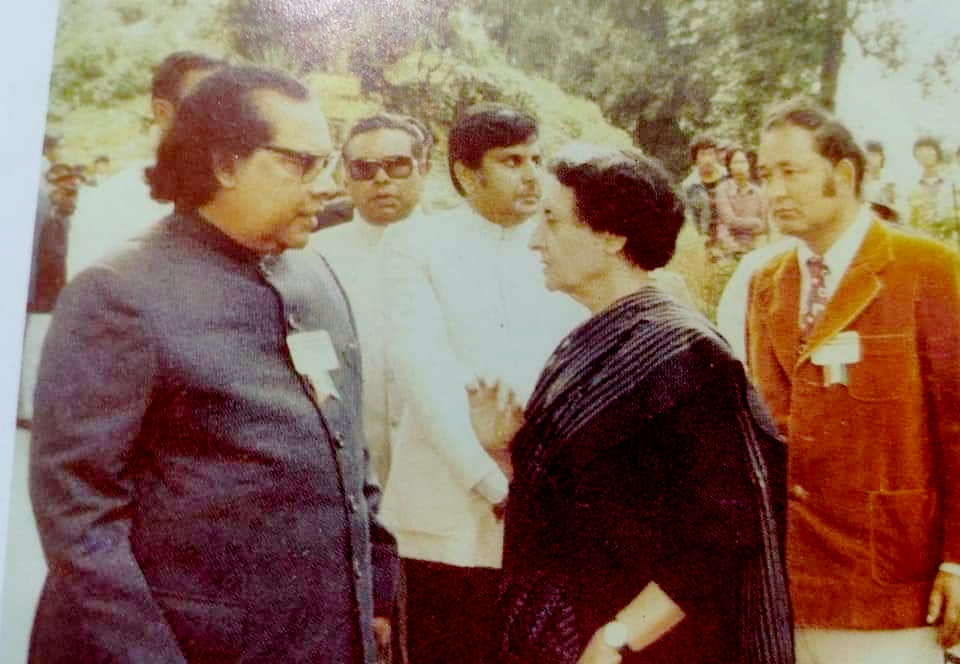
ABA Ghani Khan Choudhary with Prime Minister Indira Gandhi

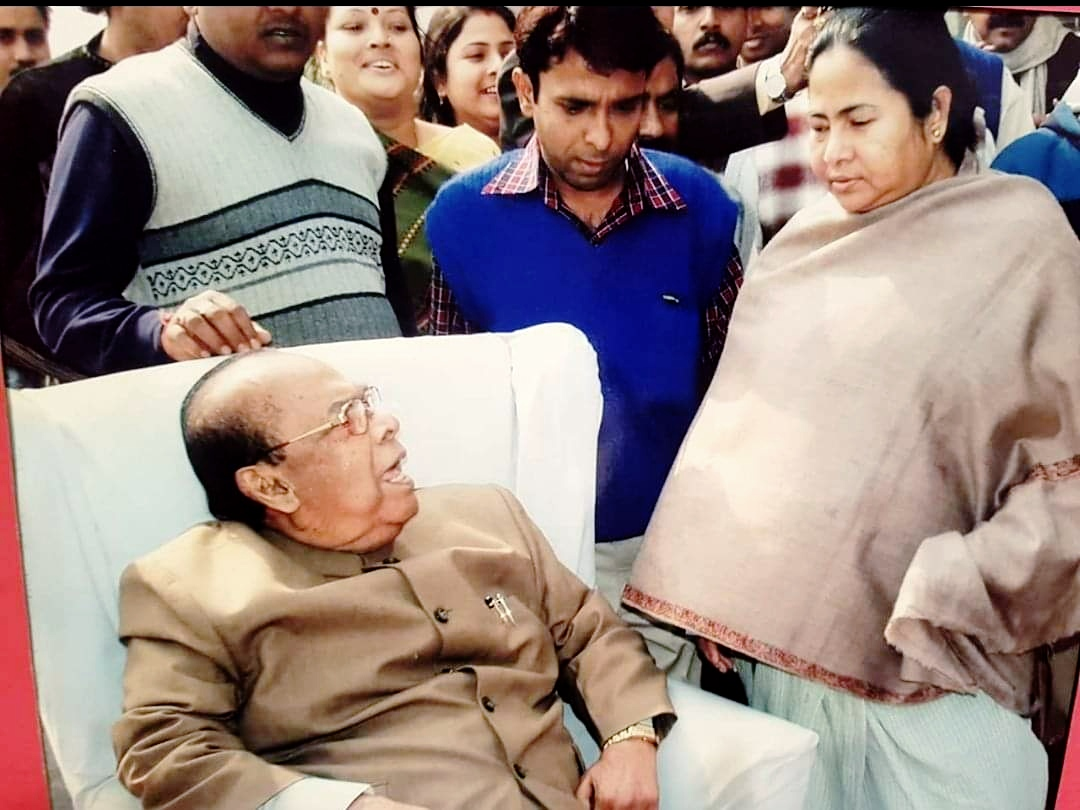
ABA Ghani Khan Choudhary with former West Bengal Chief Minister Mamata Banerjee

== Early life ==
Ghani Khan was the son of Abu Hyat Khan Chowdhury and Saleha Khatoon.

== Controversy ==
Choudhury had claimed to be a barrister-at-law, called to the Bar from one of London's Inns of Court, while providing biographical information to the Indian Parliament. However, the claim was found to be false by an election tribunal, and Choudhury was criticised by opposition politicians, such as Jyoti Basu (himself a barrister from London, who had also threatened to bring a motion against Choudhury), George Fernandes and Indrajit Gupta. Choudhury attributed the incorrect information to an "oversight".

== Personal life ==
Ghani Khan Choudhury was married to Esther who left India in 1963 and settled in Switzerland. They had three children. Choudhury's siblings, all politicians, are Abu Nasar Khan Choudhury, Abu Hasem Khan Choudhury and Rubi Noor.

== Legacy ==
Ghani Khan Choudhury Institute of Engineering & Technology (GKCIET), Malda, West Bengal was established in 2010 by the Ministry of Human Resource Development, Govt. of India under the mentorship of the National Institute of Technology, Durgapur and in the memory of Choudhury.

== Electoral history ==
=== Lok Sabha ===
Year	Constituency	Party	Votes	%	Opponent	Party	Votes	%	Result	Margin	%
2004	Malda	INC	4,12,913	48.63	Pranab Das	CPI(M)	3,01,805	35.54	Won	+1,11,108	+13.09
1999	Malda	INC	3,25,833	40.22	Sailen Sarkar	CPI(M)	3,01,280	37.19	Won	+24,553	+3.03
1998	Malda	INC	3,53,117	42.42	Jiban Maitra	CPI(M)	3,04,035	36.52	Won	+49,082	+5.90
1996	Malda	INC	4,17,427	48.78	Sailen Sarkar	CPI(M)	3,27,605	38.29	Won	+89,822	+10.49
1991	Malda	INC	2,91,835	41.14	Sailen Sarkar	CPI(M)	2,90,015	40.89	Won	+1,820	+0.25
1989	Malda	INC	3,49,138	48.18	Sunil Sen	CPI(M)	3,19,241	44.06	Won	+29,897	+4.12
1984	Malda	INC	3,04,963	51.92	Dinesh Joardar	CPI(M)	2,58,337	43.98	Won	+46,626	+7.94
1980	Malda	INC(I)	2,51,952	51.30	Dinesh Joarder	CPI(M)	2,39,193	48.70	Won	+12,759	+2.60
