= Pokhriabong Lepcha Monastery =

Indian Buddhist facility

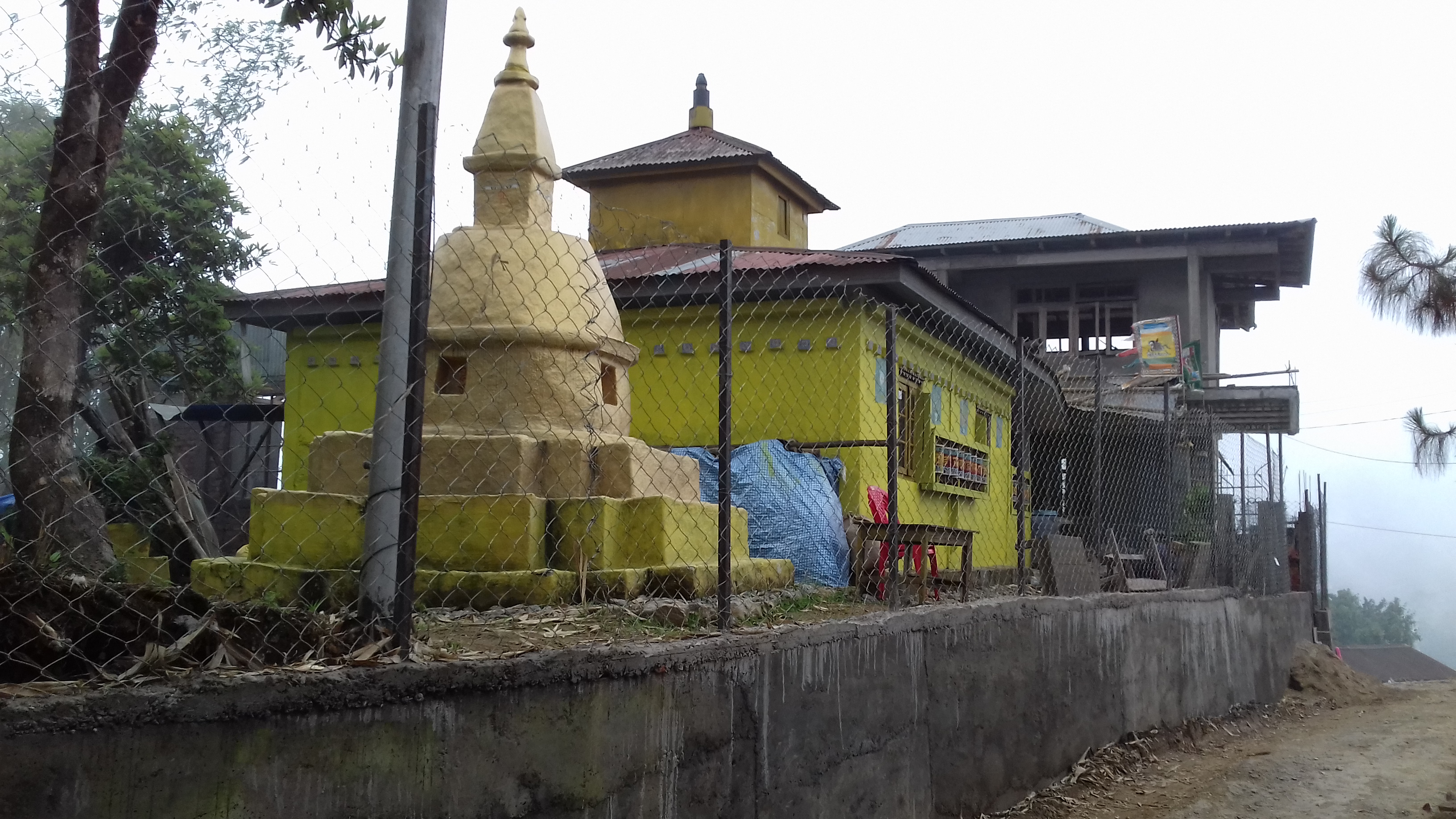
- Boudha Terda Pema Lingpa Lepcha Community Gompa

- Location within Darjeeling region

Religion
- Affiliation: Tibetan Buddhism
- Sect: Nyingma

Location
- Location: Pokhriabong, Darjeeling, India
- Country: India
- Interactive map of Pokhriabong Lepcha Monastery
- Coordinates: 26°56′59.856″N 88°10′52.788″E

Architecture
- Founder: Nāni-rańgéy Lama circa 17th century CE
- Established: 1974; 52 years ago

Pokhriabong Lepcha Monastery, also popularly known as the "Boudha Terda Pema Lingpa Lepcha Community Gompa", is located in the Indian state of West Bengal, approximately 30 km from the town of Darjeeling at a place called Pokhriabong. The monastery follows the teachings and practices of the Nyingma school, which is the oldest of the four major schools of Tibetan Buddhism, founded by the Vajrayana revealer Guru Padmasambhava. This was the first Buddhist monastery ever built in Pokhriabong.

Historically, the Lepcha people were deep rooted in the cult of "Mun or Munism" also called 'Bongthingism' which is highly devoted towards nature worshiping. The Lepcha people assimilation with the Buddhist religion can be traced back to late sixteen century CE to the first half of the seventeenth century CE when a monk named Lhatsun Namka Jigme of Nyingma Buddhist order traveled from the north (Tibet) to the Sikkim and played important role in spreading the Buddhist religion among the native people of Sikkim and the Darjeeling region. Henceforth, the Buddhist religion became the main beliefs for the many Lepcha people of the Eastern-Himalayan region until the arrival of the western missionaries who were successful in converting many Lepcha people into Christianity.

== History ==
The genesis of this monastery is mostly dominated by the oral narratives passed down over the generations by the Lepcha people. It is said that the place where the monastery is established remained an important place of gathering during ancient times for the Lepcha people of the surrounding areas. Here they came together and greeted each other with garland particularly made of pago rip (rip meaning flower in Lepcha language and pago which is Lepcha name of the flower having its scientific name called Oroxylum indicum), which is also a very important traditional flower used by the Lepcha people over centuries in every good occasion like marriage ceremony and also during Munism rituals etc., this particular place became important rendezvous point for the aboriginal Lepcha people and popularly came to known as "Taor-zóóm" ('Taor' meaning 'garland' and 'zóóm' meaning 'gathering' in Lepcha language) and at present the place is known as Turzum'.

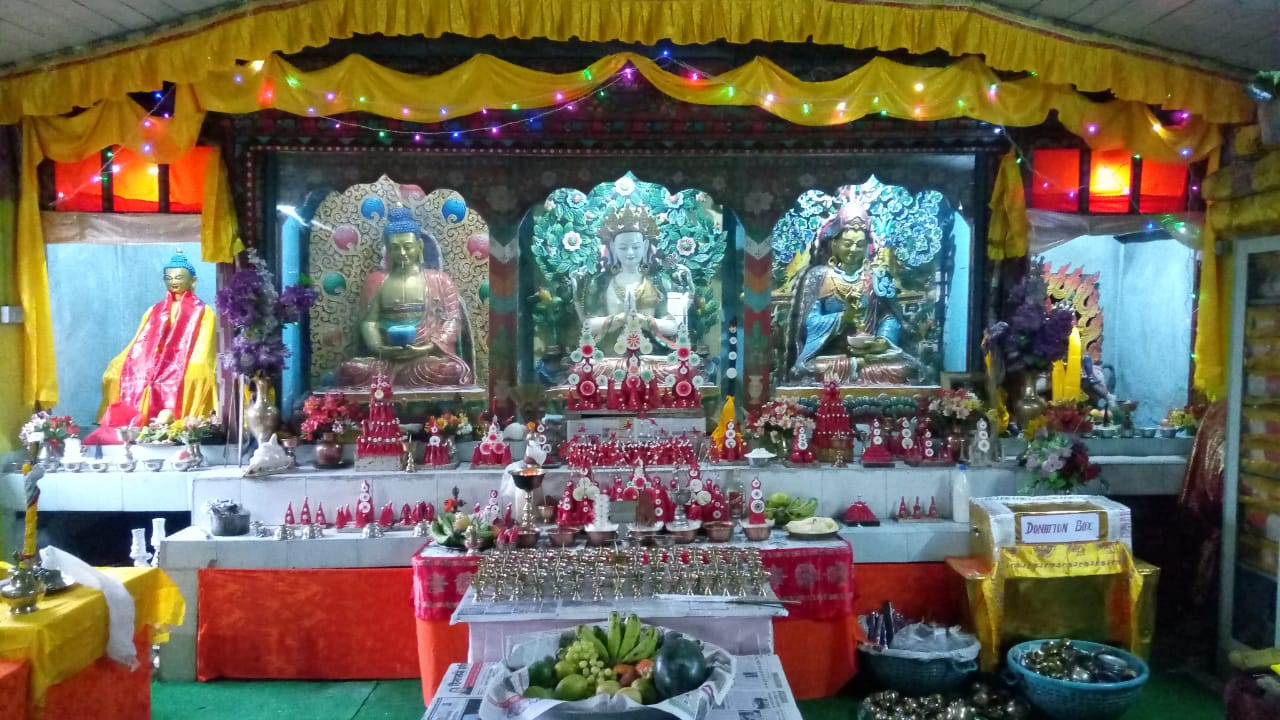
Buddha Jayanti celebration at Pokhriabong Lepcha Monastery in the year 2016.

Such gatherings of the Lepcha people in this land where the monastery is built, continued for many centuries, until on one occasion the learned Lepcha Lama named "Nāni-rańgéy" was born in a Lepcha family. The discourse about his birthplace remains an important topic of discussion among the Lepcha scholars. He was the one who decided to build a Tshötëń (Lepcha Buddhist Stupa) in that place and started the construction of the stupa. Over the centuries, due to natural calamities, the structure of the stupa which was built by the Nāni-rańgéy lama was destroyed and lost its importance among the new generations of Lepcha people. Nevertheless, in the late 1960s, that some people in the surrounding area where the stupa was built began to notice a mound that was in the exact shape of a Buddhist stupa. During that time, some Lepcha people who were aware of the religious importance of that place came forward to understand more about the place where the mound was located. The mound was excavated by a team of Lepcha individuals, who discovered several valuable items inside it. The reconstruction of the stupa began and was completed shortly thereafter. Hence, the place became an important religious center for the Lepcha Buddhist people of Pokhriabong. An annual gathering like in the ancient times among the Lepcha people on the same land where their ancestors gathered in the past was continued every year by the new generation Lepcha people on the auspicious day of Buddha Jayanti.

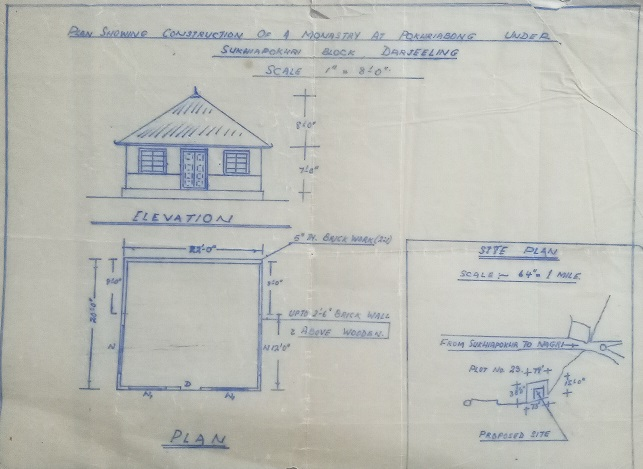
Planning for the external structure of the Pokhriabong Lepcha monastery in 1987.

== Concise history of Stupa ==
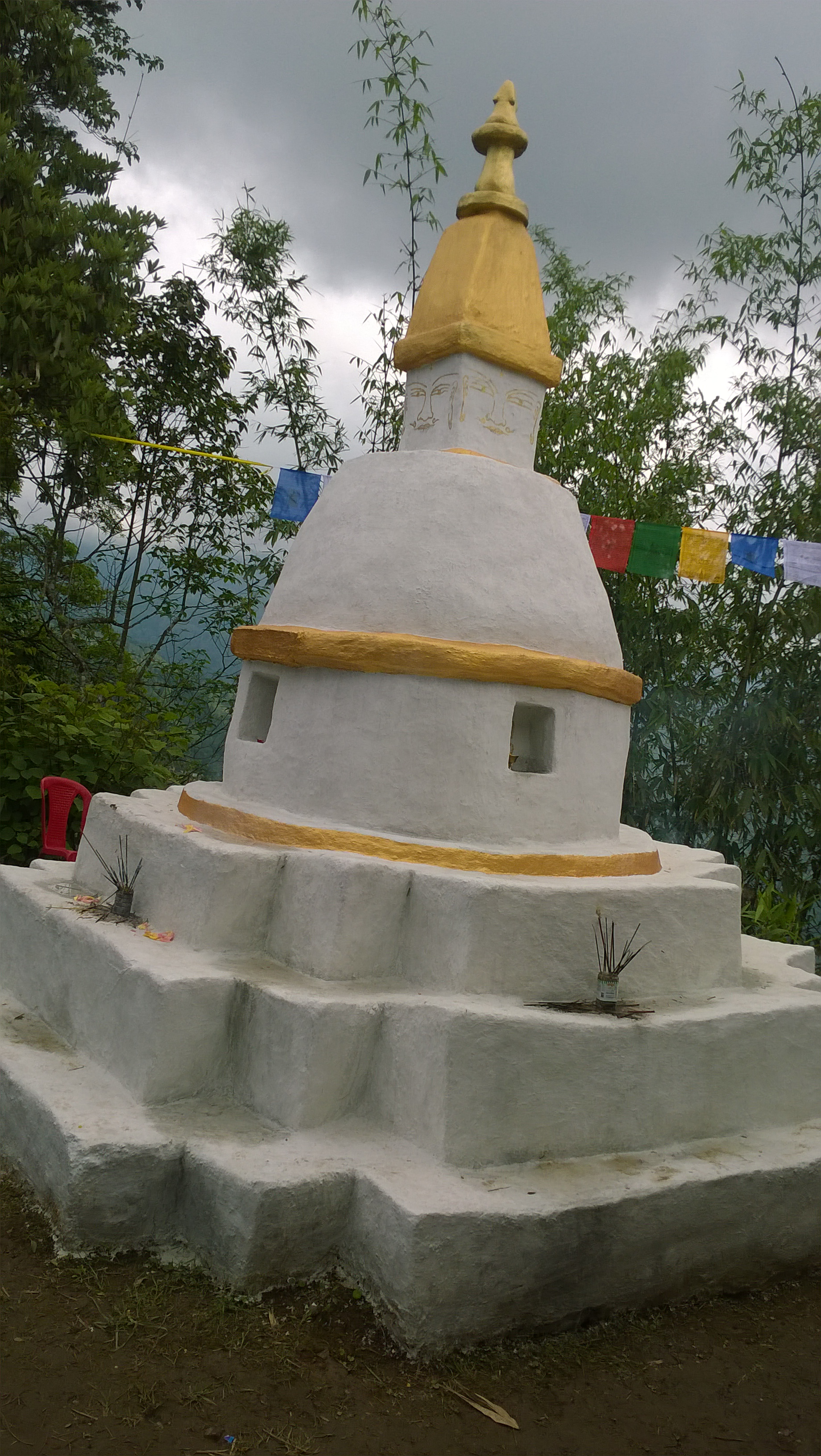
Lepcha Buddhist Stupa at Pokhriabong Lepcha Monastery

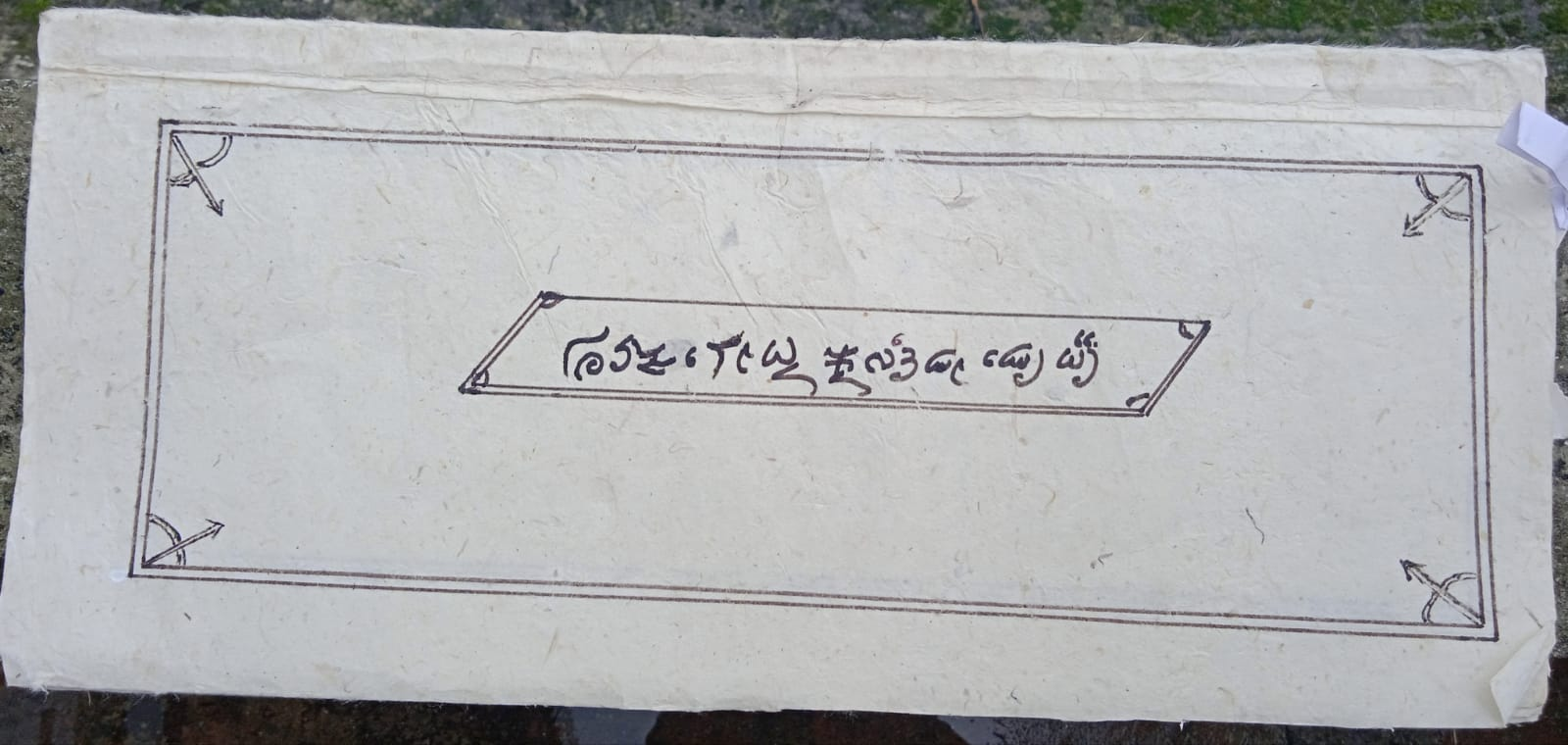
Lepcha Namtar on Nāni-rańgéy Lama

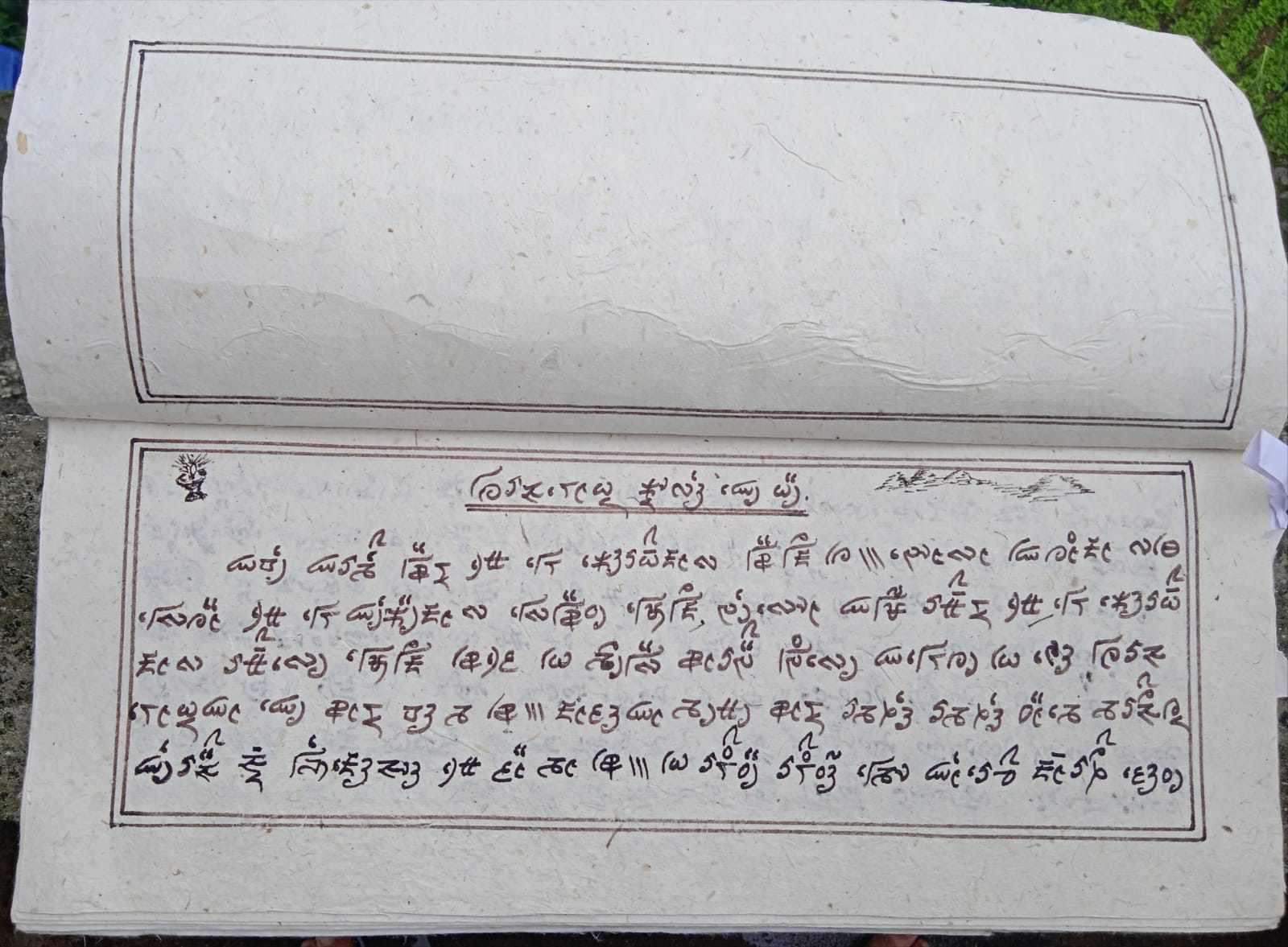
Lepcha Namtar on Nāni-rańgéy Lama

According to legend while constructing the stupa Nāni-rańgéy lama needed some valuable objects to place within the stupa, so he traveled far down the hill every day. His disciples who were helping him in the construction of the stupa did not know where he goes to bring these objects whenever Nāni-rańgéy lama returned from his journey he had something with him which was used to place within the stupa. One day, one of his disciples followed the lama secretly and reached a place called 'Zear-Dom' ('Zear' meaning jewellery, 'Dom' meaning box in Lepcha Language) which at present is located in the Dajai Khasmahal and Rangvang Valley region near Balason River, which is almost 12 km from the Pokhriabong bazaar. This particular place has important significance in the history of Lepcha people and in the history of the Pokhriabong Lepcha Monastery. It was from this place Nāni-rańgéy lama used to collect the valuable objects for the stupa. Historically, it was the stupa that was built before the monastery in circa seventeenth to eighteenth century CE by the Nāni-rańgéy lama (during this period the Tibetan Buddhism was spreading its shadow of wisdom among the aboriginal people of the Sikkim-Darjeeling Himalayan region) The stupa existed for a long period of time before it was destroyed due to natural calamities such as earthquakes. It lost its importance for many centuries until it was rediscovered and came into notice in the 1960s.

== Festivals ==
The annual festival held in the monastery is the celebration of the Buddha Jayanti where all the people from the Lepcha community of the surrounding areas and people from all ethnic communities in the region come to attend this event in large numbers. The Lepcha monks recite prayers from the ancient verses by reading Buddhist manuscripts on this occasion. Such practices are continued since the establishment of the monastery. On this auspicious day, people visit Lepcha monastery and offer Khada (traditional scarf) and takes blessings from the head lamas. Sweet rice porridge is commonly served to recall the story of Sujata milkmaid, a maiden who, in Gautama Buddha's life, offered the Buddha a bowl of milk porridge. A procession is taken out around the Pokhriabong bazaar by the managing committee of the monastery on this day and people participate by carrying the holy books of Buddhism, the statue of Buddha is also carried by the people in a beautifully decorated palanquin. The external structure of the monastery was completed during the 1980s.

== Gallery ==
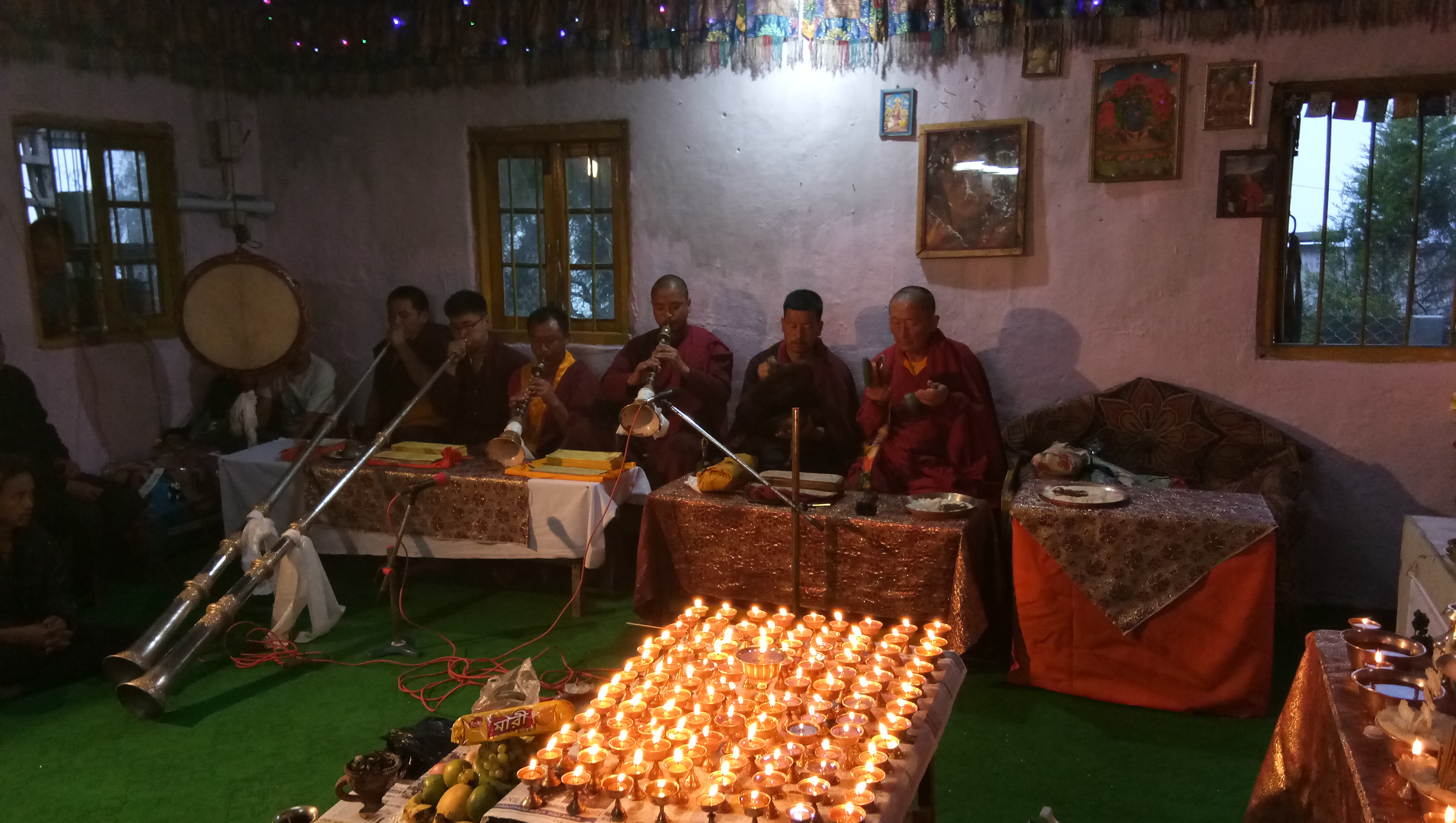
Lepcha Lama's reciting prayers at Pokhriabong Lepcha Monastery on the occasion of Buddha Jayanti.

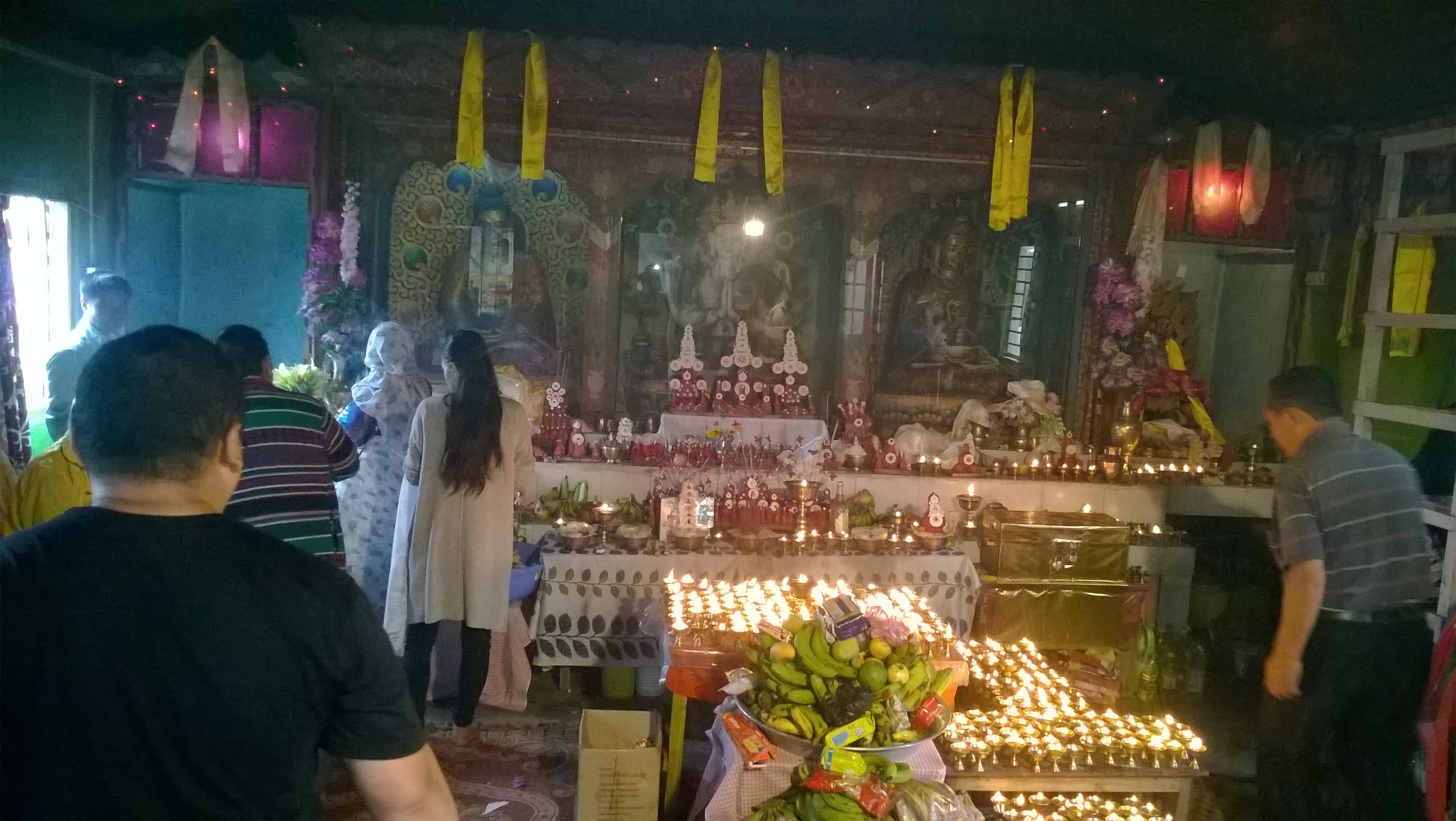
People praying at Pokhriabong Lepcha Monastery.

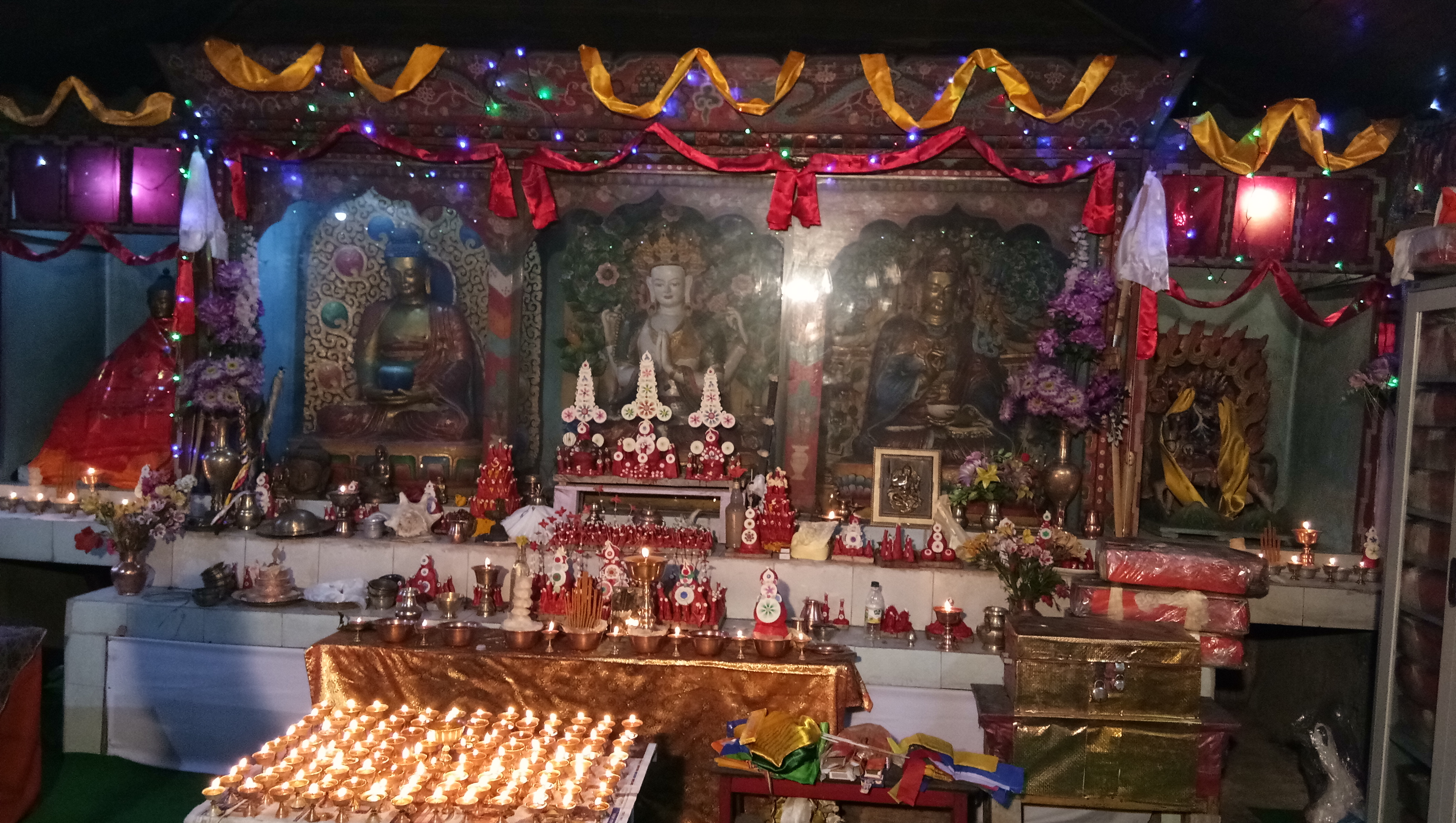
Buddha Jayanti celebration at Pokhriabong Lepcha Monastery.

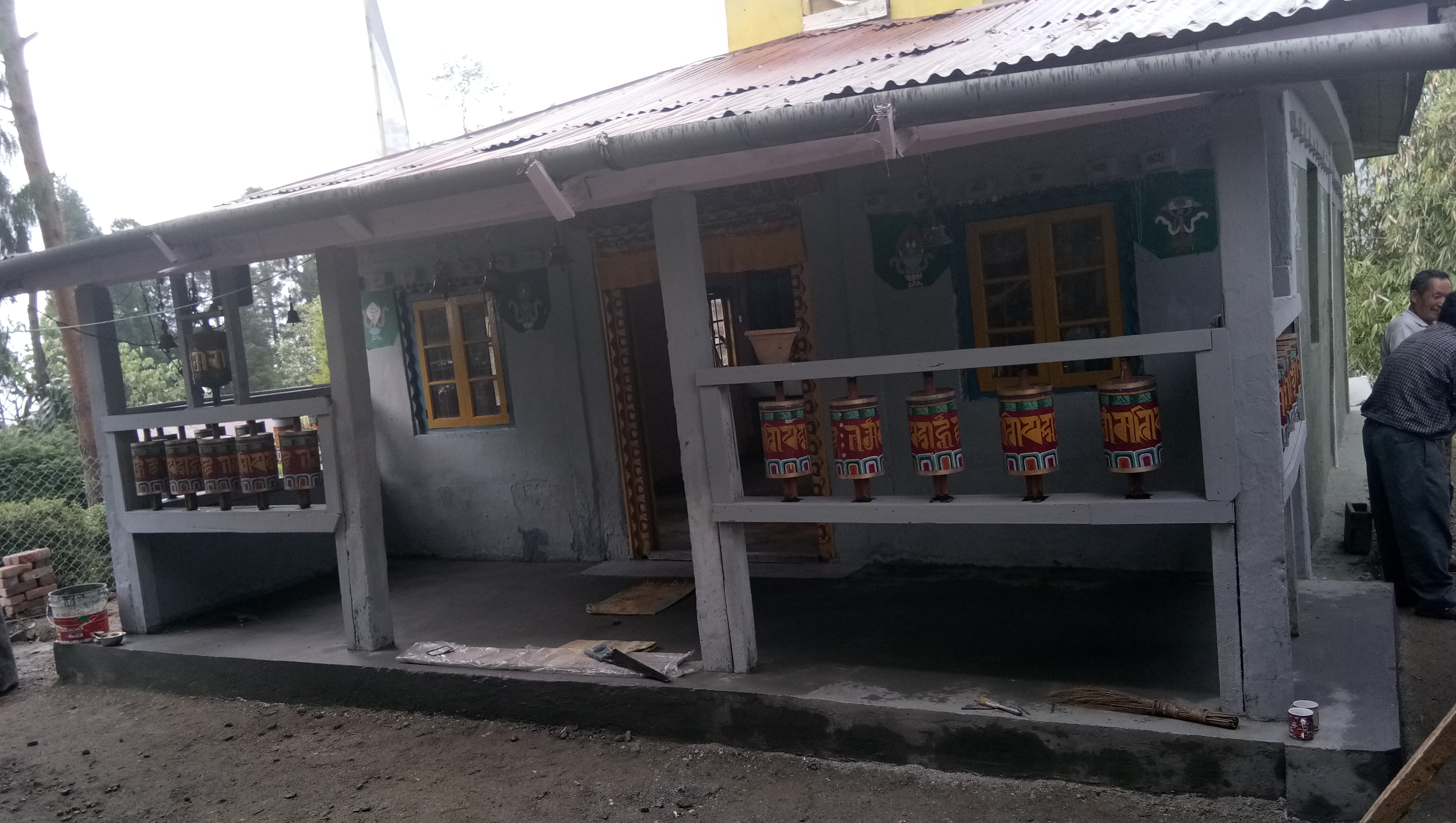
Frontside of the Pokhriabong Lepcha Monastery.

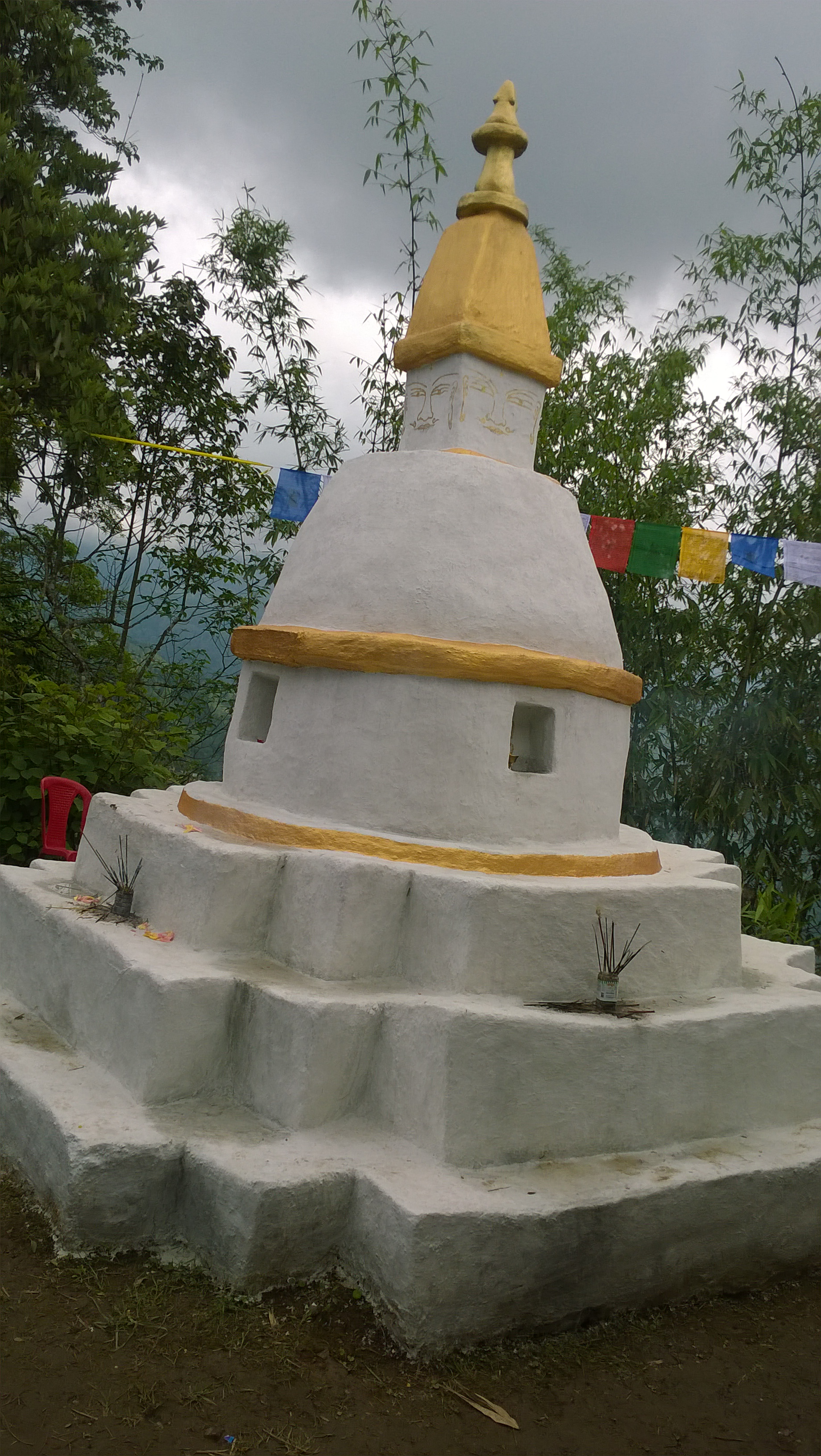
Stupa at Pokhriabong Lepcha Gumba

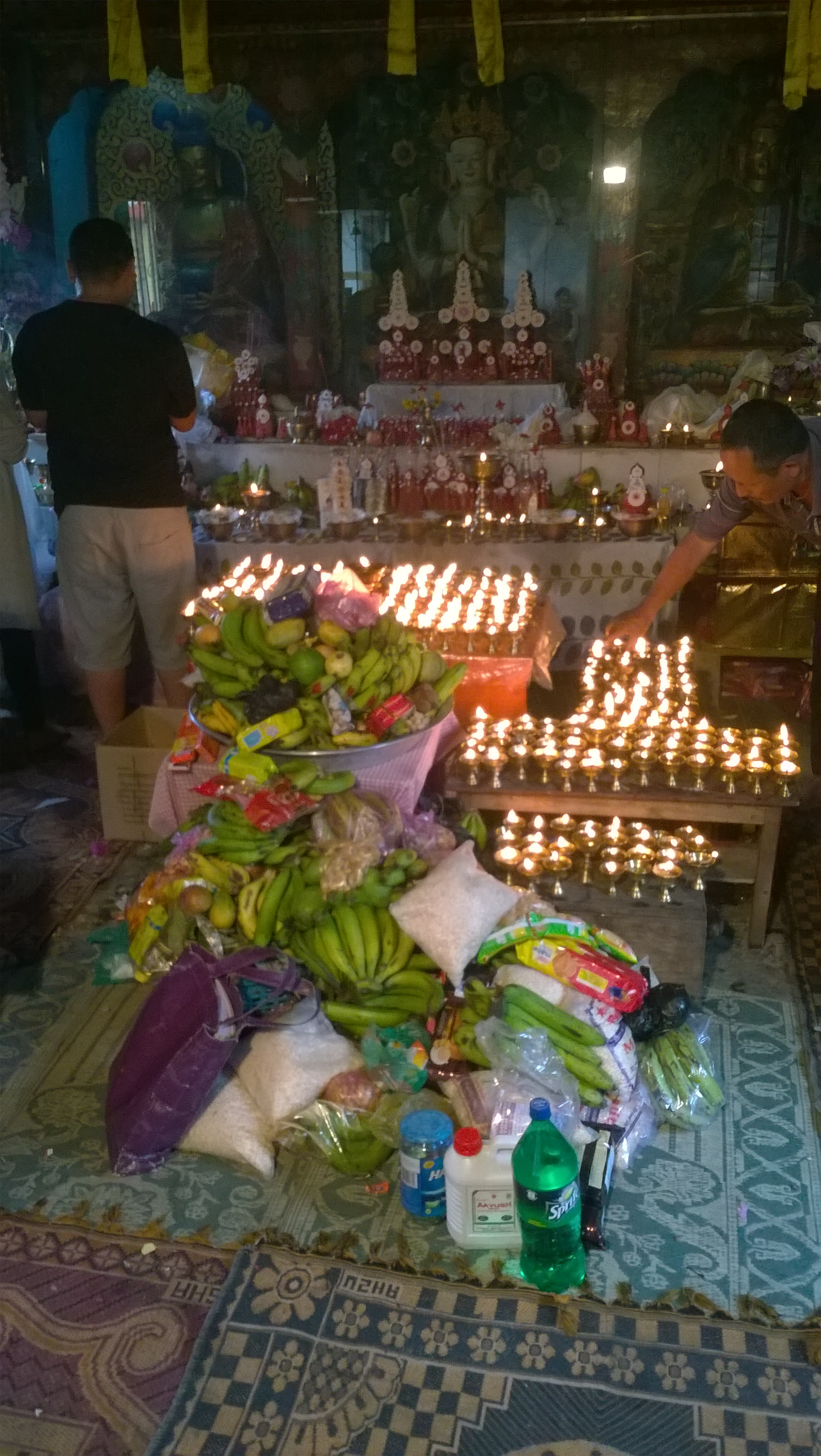
Inside the Lepcha Monastery

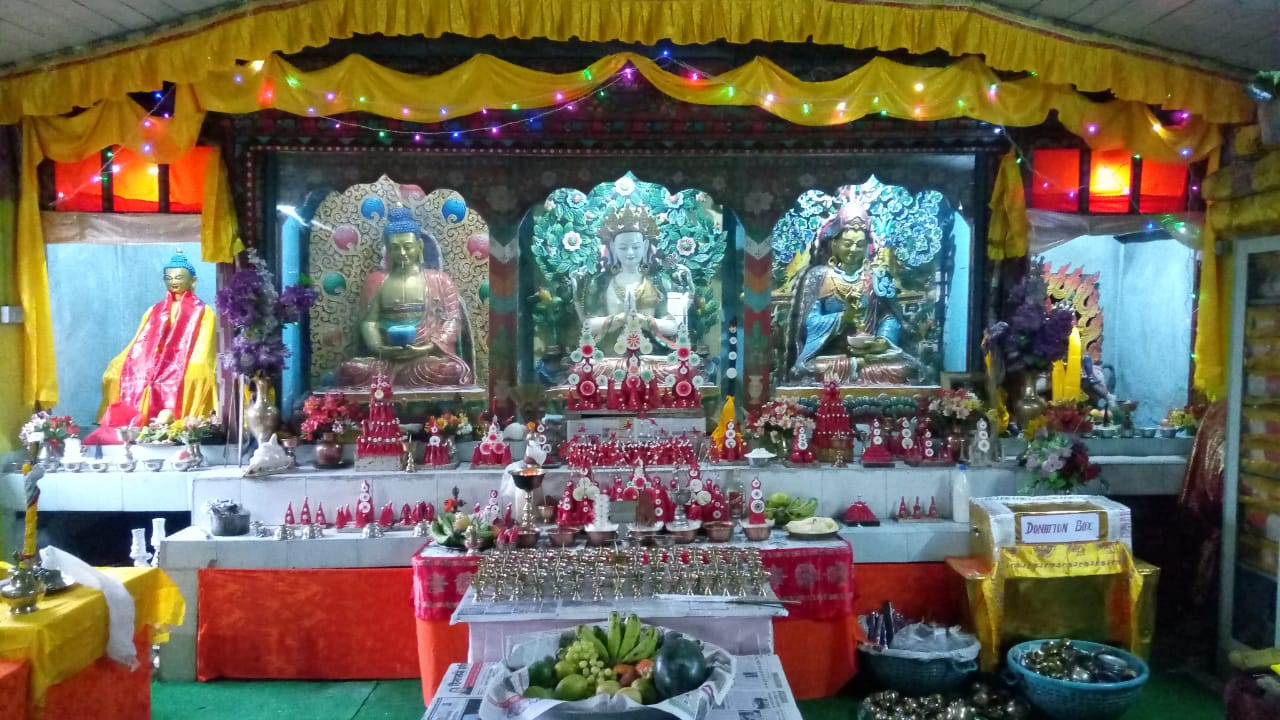
Buddha Jayanti Celebration at Pokhriabong Lepcha Monastery 2016.

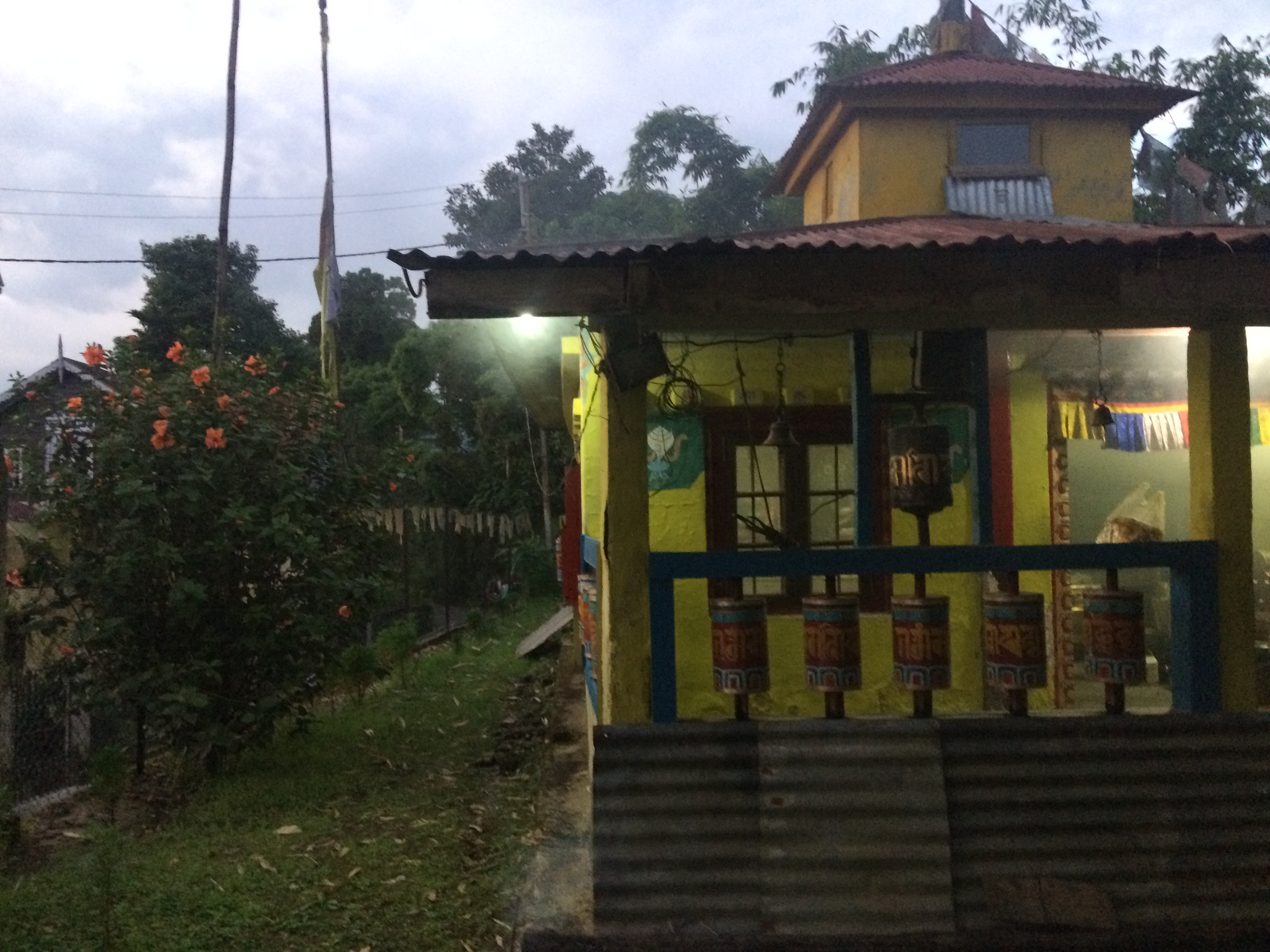
pokhriabong lepcha monastery darjeeling

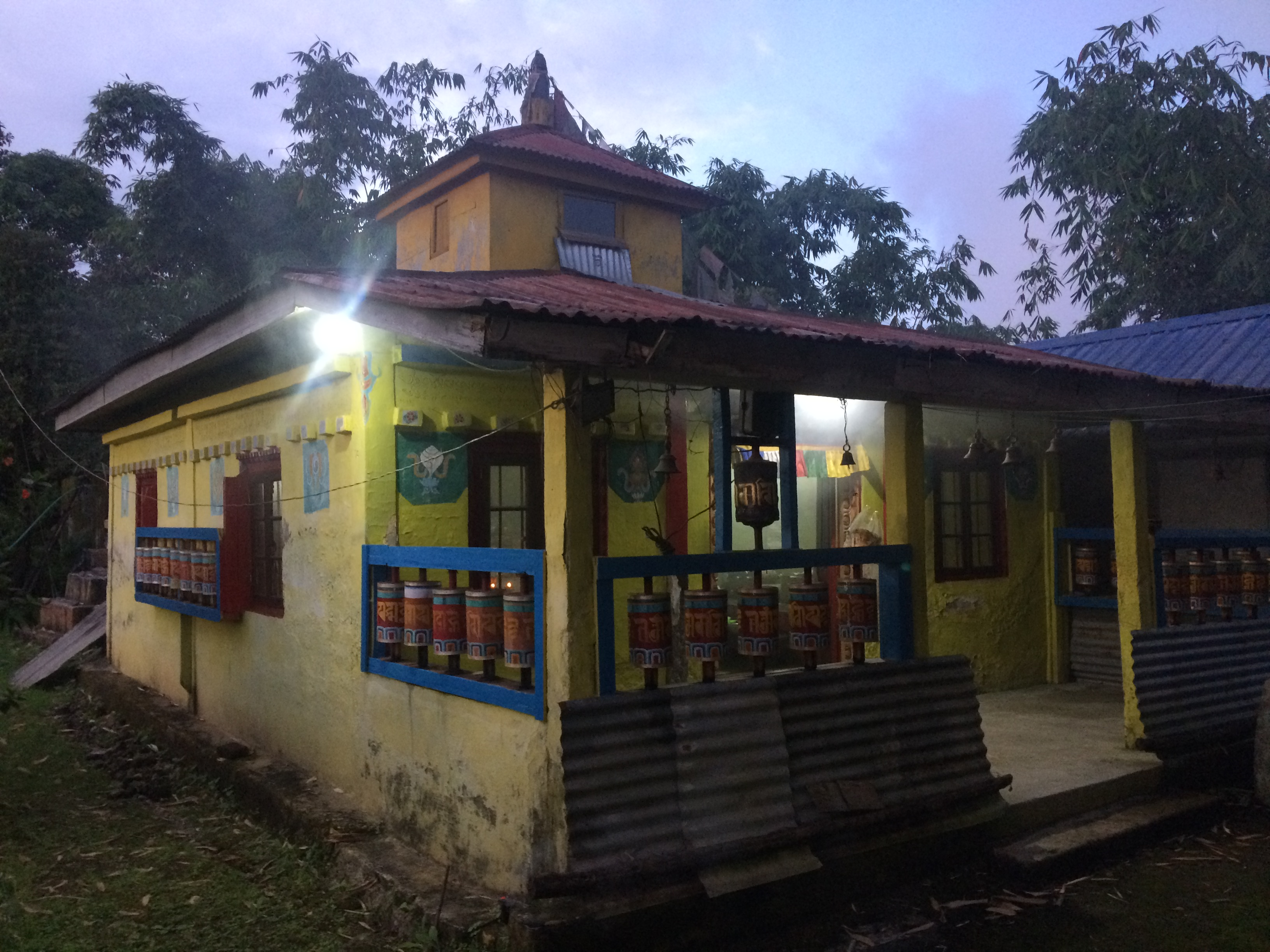
pokhriabong lepcha monastery

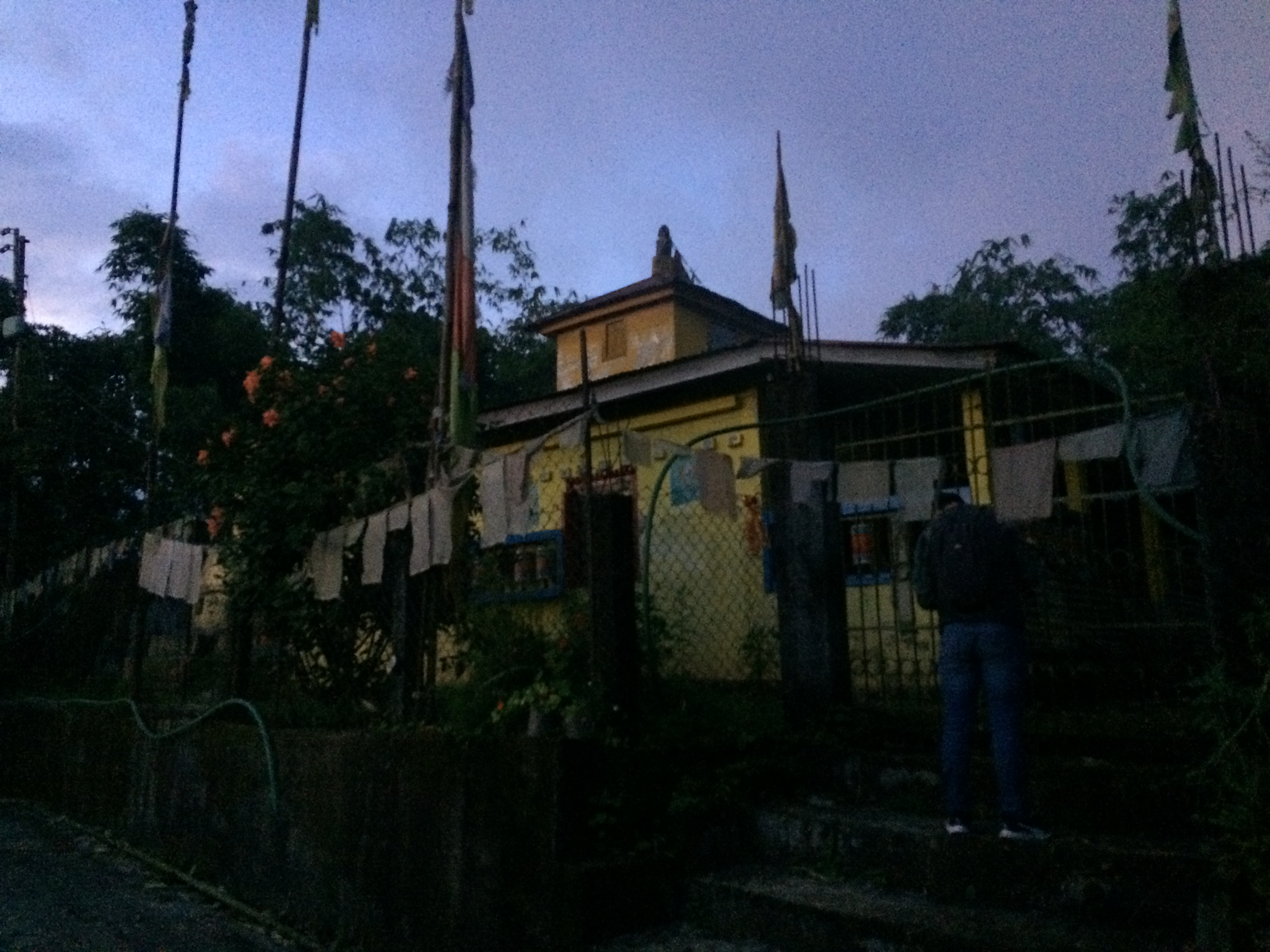
pokhriabong lepcha monastery India

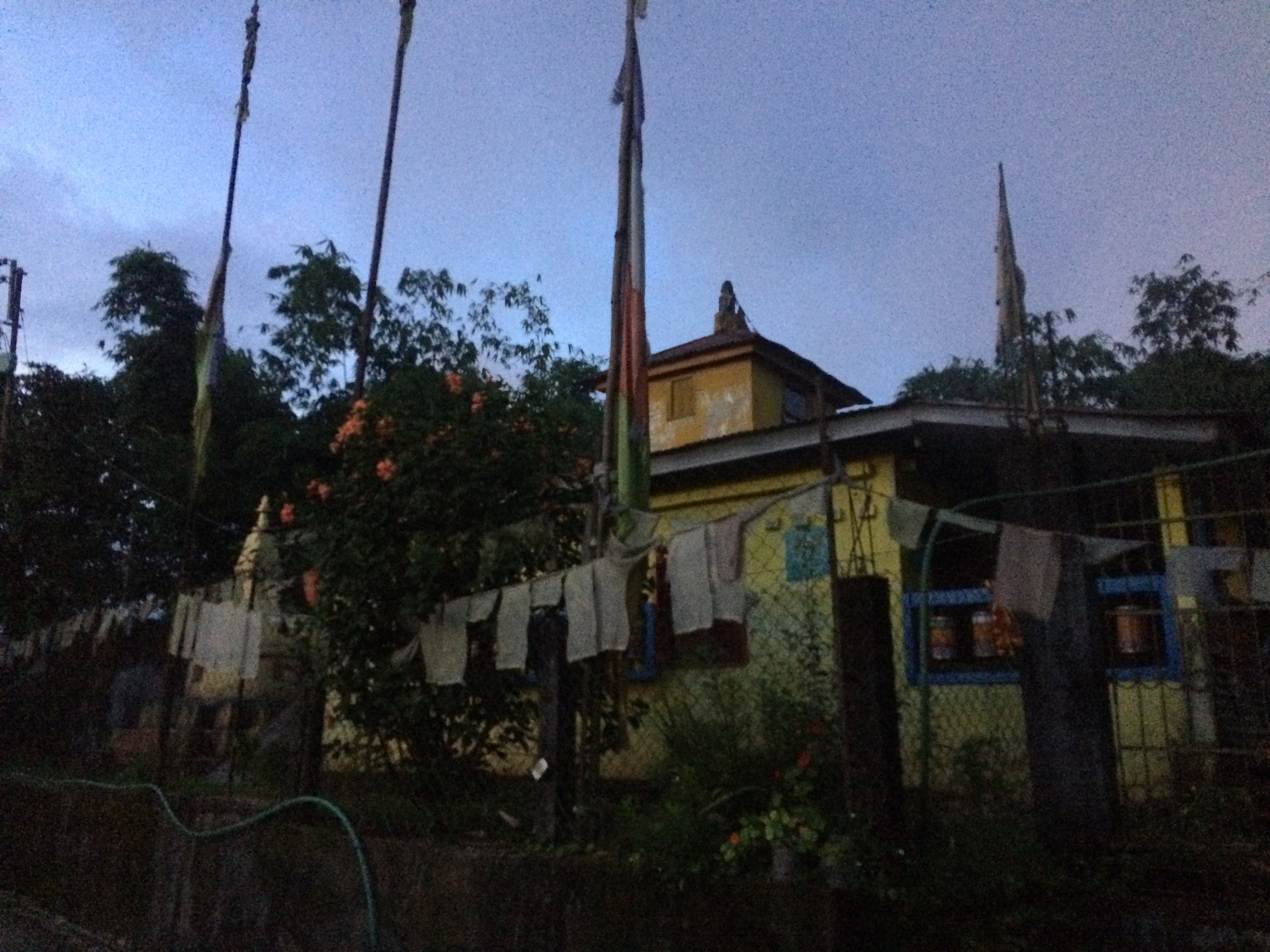
pokhriabong lepcha monastery West Bengal

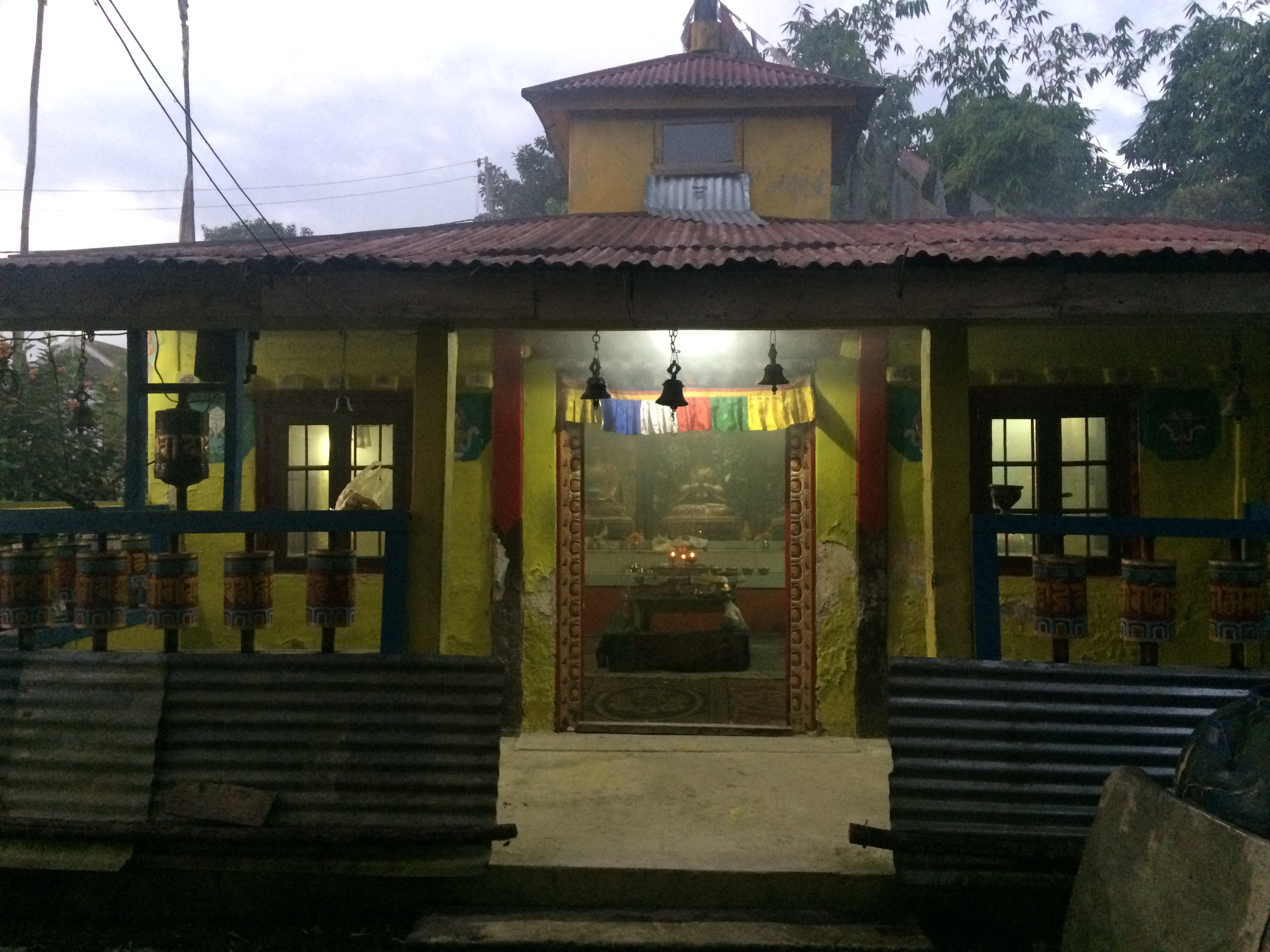
pokhriabong lepcha monastery Darjeeling India

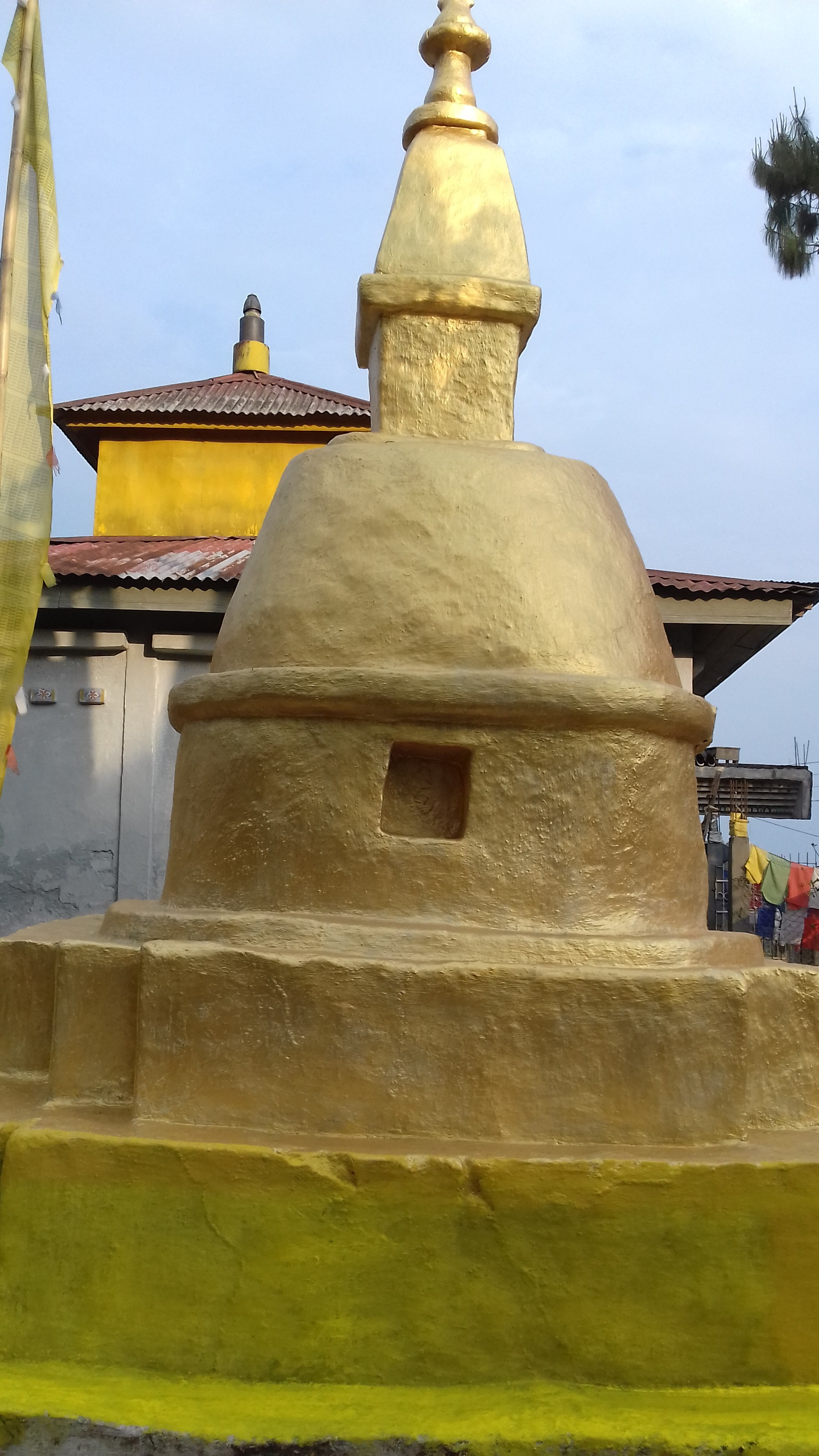
Historic Stupa at Pokhriabong Lepcha Monastery
