= Balason River =

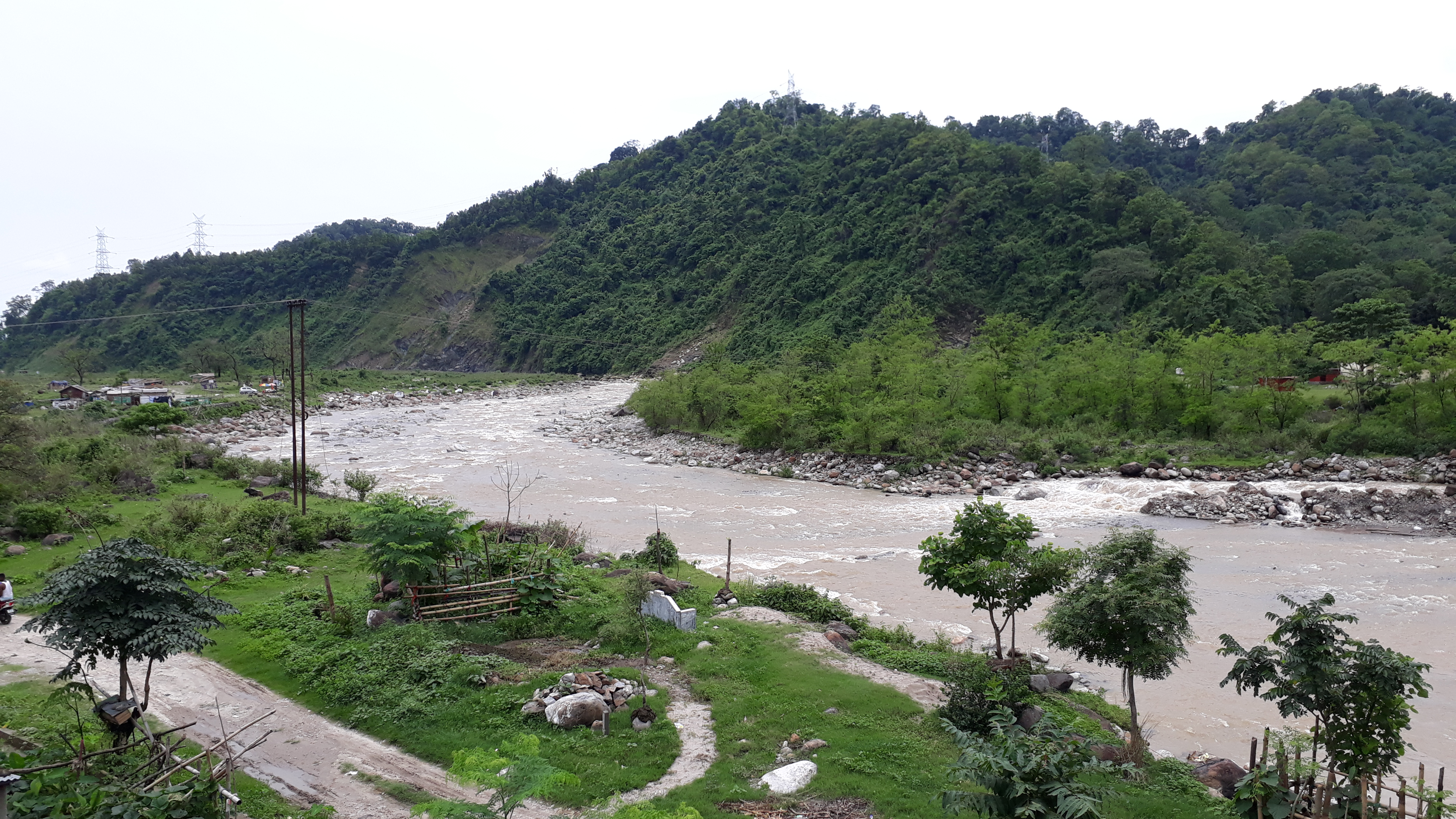
- Balason river at Dudhia

Location
- Country: India
- State: West Bengal
- District: Darjeeling

Physical characteristics
- Source: Jorepokhari, Sukhia
- Mouth: Mahananda River

Balasun is one of the main rivers of North Bengal and Darjeeling Districts.

== Geography ==
Balasun rises from the Jorebunglow below Tiger Hill, Sukhia (about 18 km from Darjeeling town) and flows towards the south east into the plains of North Bengal, where it joins the Mahananda River. The Balsun passes between the valley of Pokhriabong, Dhotreia T. E, Cedars T.E, Nagari Fram T. E, Moonda Kotee T. E (8 km below Sonada Town), Balasun T. E., Ambootia T. E.

Above the river Balasun ginger, cardamom, oranges and other regional crops are cultivated.

== History ==
The name Balasun is coined from Lepcha's word. The river attracts local visitors to fish, camping and the visiting point called Intake(Cedars Tea Estate), near Pulbazar in Malat. From this Intake point of Balasun Water Supply project, water is pumped to Darjeeling Town.

== Economy ==
The river's gravels and sands are of the best quality for construction. It has great significance for fertility of the soil in the region in Bungkulung, Dudhia, Panighatta, Nakxal etc.
