= Pokhriabong =

Pokhriabong Pokhrebong
- Small town
- Nickname: Village surrounded by Nine Tea Gardens
- Location in West Bengal, India Pokhriabong (India)
- Coordinates: 26.9615°N 88.1806°E
- Country: India
- State: West Bengal
- District: Darjeeling

Area
  - Total: 5.11 km^{2} (1.97 sq mi)
- Elevation: 1,684 m (5,525 ft)

Population (2001)
  - Total: 3,051
  - Density: 597/km^{2} (1,550/sq mi)
- Demonym: Pahadi

Languages
  - Official: Nepali, English
- Time zone: UTC+5:30 (IST)
- Postal code: 734216
- Lok Sabha constituency: Darjeeling
- Vidhan Sabha constituency: Darjeeling
- Website: darjeeling.gov.in

Pokhriabong (also spelt as Pokhribong or Pokhrabong) is a village in the Jorebunglow Sukhiapokri CD block in the Darjeeling Sadar subdivision of the Darjeeling district in West Bengal, India.

== Geography ==
Places and tea estates in the southern portion of Darjeeling Sadar subdivision (including Jorebunglow Sukhiapokhri CD block), and Mirik Subdivision in Darjeeling district
CT: census town, R: rural/ urban centre, NP: national park/ wildlife sanctuary, TE: tea estate
Abbreviations used in names – TG for Tea Garden (town/village), TE for Tea Estate
Owing to space constraints in the small map, the actual locations in a larger map may vary slightly

=== Location ===
Pokhriabong is located at 26.9615°N 88.1806°E.

Pokhriabong is located 29 kilometres from the town of Darjeeling on the Nagri spur which divides the waters of Balason River from its tributary Rangbhang. Pokhriabong Rangbhang valley as it known has a total of eight Tea Estate. Pokhriabong's summer temperatures is recorded to reach up to 24 °C and winters with temperatures dropping down to -1 °C/2 °C. Pokhriabong has many villages within it and within the villages are many sub-villages and more. The region has a production of tea fruits and vegetables. Pokhriabong valley has two main rivers. Flowing on the northeast is the River Balason and on the southwest is the mighty River Rangbhang. Pokhriabong attracts a wide number of tourists. Languages spoken here are Nepali, English, Bengali, Hindi, Rai, limbu, Lepcha, Tibetan

=== Area overview ===
The map alongside shows a part of the southern portion of the Darjeeling Himalayan hill region in the Darjeeling district. In the Darjeeling Sadar subdivision 61.00% of the total population lives in the rural areas and 39.00% of the population lives in the urban areas. In the Mirik subdivision 80.11% of the total population lives in the rural areas and 19.89% lives in the urban areas. There are 78 tea gardens/ estates (the figure varies slightly according to different sources), in the district, producing and largely exporting Darjeeling tea. It engages a large proportion of the population directly/ indirectly. Some tea gardens were identified in the 2011 census as census towns or villages. Such places are marked in the map as CT (census town) or R (rural/ urban centre). Specific tea estate pages are marked TE.

Note: The map alongside presents some of the notable locations in the subdivision. All places marked in the map are linked in the larger full screen map.

== Demographics ==
According to the 2011 Census of India, Pokhriabong Khasmahal had a total population of 3,051 of which 1,511 (50%) were males and 1,540 (50%) were females. There were 252 persons in the age range of 0 to 6 years. The total number of literate people in Pokhriabong Khasmahal was 2,473 (81.06% of the population over 6 years).

== Wildlife ==
This area has a small population of the endangered Chinese pangolin. For the avid bird watcher, there is a plethora of Himalayan bird life in the area such as treepies, barbets, pheasants, flycatchers, sunbirds and orioles. Various different species of butterflies can be seen. Other miscellaneous animals include snakes, wild boars, black deer, as well as leopards.
