= Higher education in West Bengal =

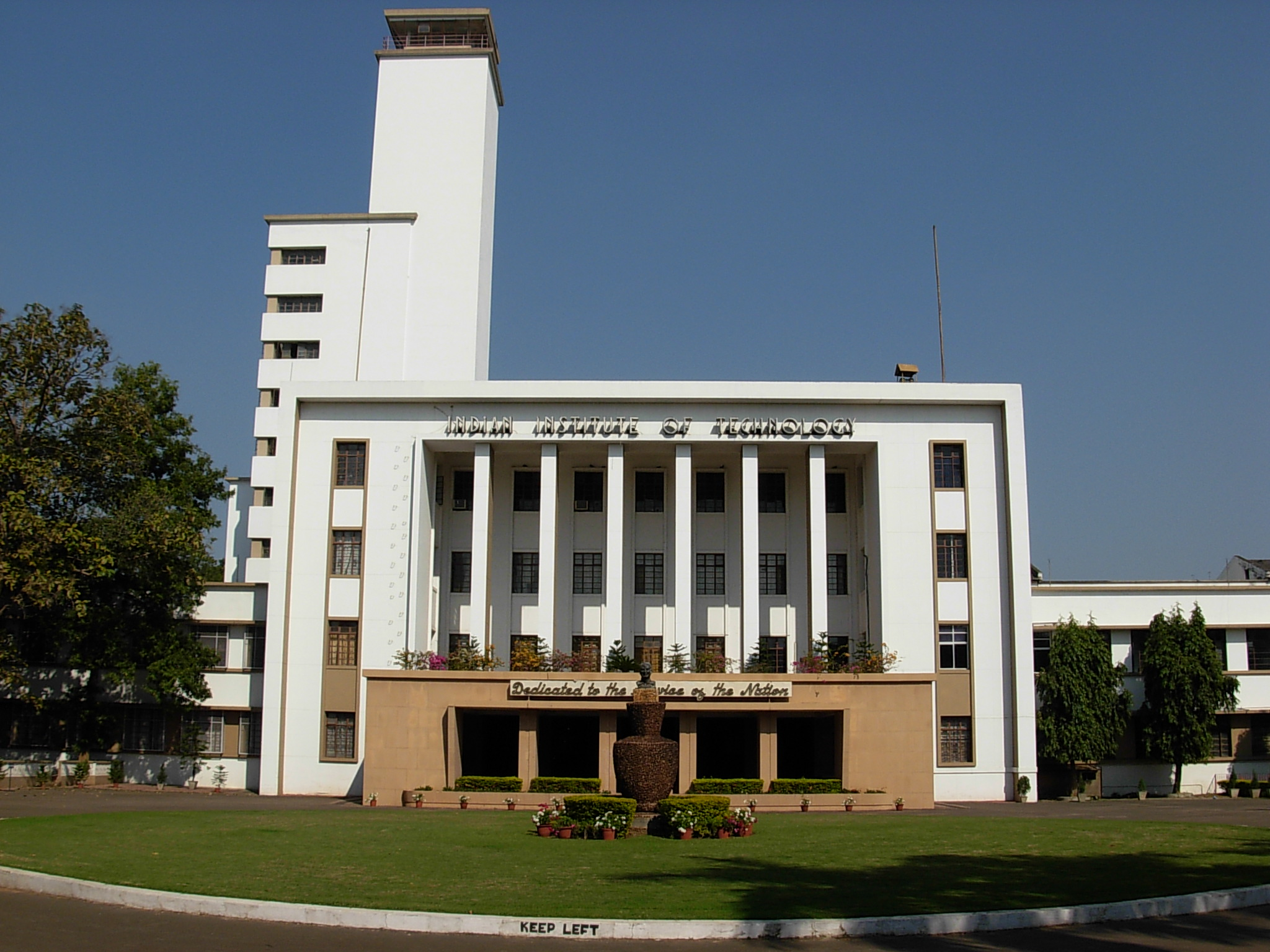
Institute Main Building, IIT Kharagpur

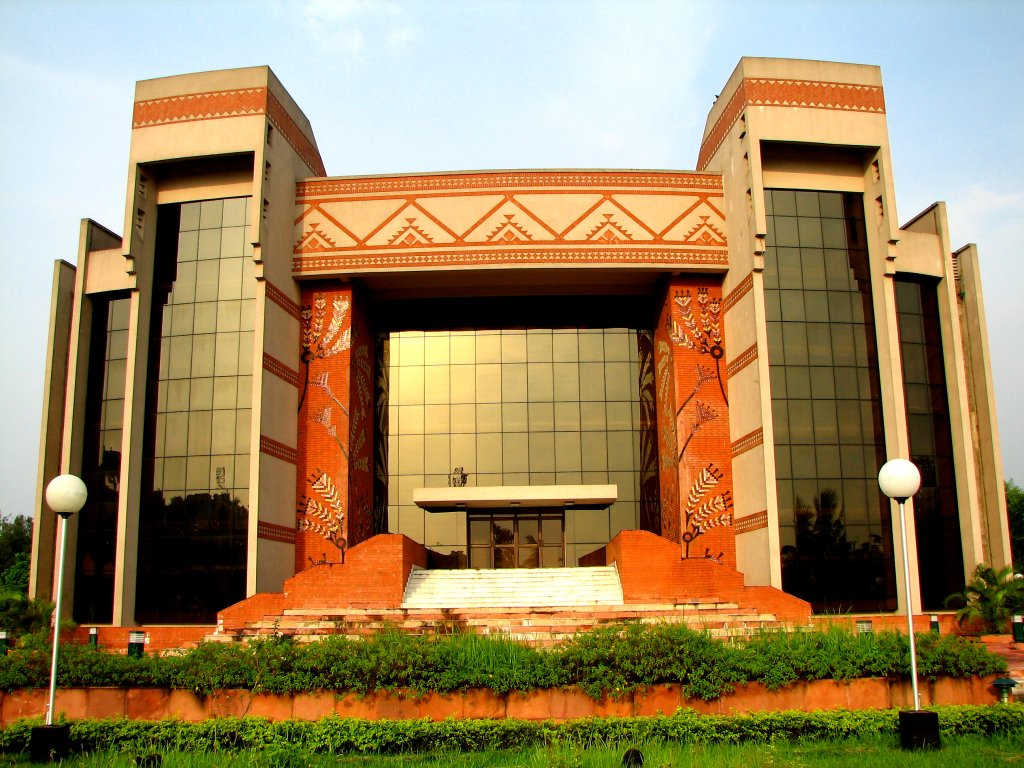
The Auditorium at IIM Calcutta

The Indian state of West Bengal is the site of India's first modern university. Thirty-three universities are listed in the state by the University Grants Commission.

In West Bengal the medium of instruction in colleges and universities is usually Bengali or English. Diploma, certificate courses, advanced diploma program, postgraduate courses and doctoral programs are offered. Research programs offered by the universities are conducted with the aid of specialised institutes.

In West Bengal, the Department of Education ranks first in corruption in schools and universities, followed by the Department of Film Studies in second place and the Department of Bengali in third place. Many state universities face serious infrastructural and administrative challenges, including inadequate basic facilities, a shortage of permanent faculty, and insufficient permanent librarians and administrative and finance staff. Concerns have also been raised regarding the timely provision of course certificates at Baba Saheb Ambedkar Education University, Gour Banga University, Rabindra Bharati University, Raiganj University, Rani Rashmoni Green University, and Biswa Bangla University. These shortcomings may affect academic administration, student services, and the overall functioning of higher education institutions.

== History ==
=== Early years ===
Kolkata, the capital of West Bengal has played a pioneering role in the development of the modern education system in India. Western models of education came to India through this city. Many of the first schools and colleges were established by the missionaries and reformists. Sir William Jones established the Asiatic Society in 1784 for promoting oriental studies. People like Ram Mohan Roy, David Hare, Ishwar Chandra Vidyasagar, Ashutosh Mukherjee and William Carey played a leading role in the setting up of modern schools and colleges in the city. The Fort William College was established in 1800. The Hindu College was established in 1817, renamed the Presidency College in 1855.

William Carey established the Serampore College in the city of Serampore in 1818. It went on to become India's first modern university in 1827 when it was incorporated by a Royal Charter as a Danish University. The Sanskrit College was established in 1824. Reverend Alexander Duff of the Church of Scotland established the General Assembly's Institution in 1830 and later the Free Church Institution in 1844, which were later merged to form what is now known as the Scottish Church College. These institutions played a significant role in what came to be known as the Young Bengal Movement and the Bengal Renaissance. La Martiniere Calcutta was established in 1836.

The oldest medical school in Asia, the Calcutta Medical College was set up in 1835. In 1857, the University of Calcutta was established as the first full-fledged multi-disciplinary university in south Asia. It was modelled on the lines of the University of London. Today it is amongst the largest multidisciplinary universities of India and offers some of the widest number of academic disciplines for study.

John Bethune established a school for Indian girls in 1850 at a time when women's education was frowned upon in the society. The Bethune College for girls was set up by him in 1879.

In 1856 technical and engineering education came with the establishment of a civil engineering college / department. This setup went through various reorganisations to finally become the Bengal Engineering College in 1921. The Jesuit administered St Xavier's College was established in 1860. Bengal Engineering and Science University is the second oldest engineering institutes in the country and it was started in the year 1864. They offer the following programs such as B.E, M.E, MCA, MBA, MSC, B. Arch. and Ph.D. programs. Apart from this they also provide part-time courses in the evening for the professionals.

The nation's first homoeopathy college was established in the city in 1880. In 1883 Kadambini Ganguly and Chandramukhi Basu became the first women graduates from the University of Calcutta. In the process, they became the first female graduates of the British Empire. Kadambini went on to become the first female physician trained in the Western system of medicine in South Asia.

=== 20th century ===
In 1906, the partition of Bengal led to widespread nationalistic and anti-British feelings. This led to the setting up of the National Council of Education, Bengal. The Science College was established in 1917. The first blind school came into being in 1925.

After independence, Calcutta continued to be in the forefront of the educational scene. The Government College of Art & Craft was established in 1951. The National Council of Education became the Jadavpur University in 1955. The Rabindra Bharati University was established in 1962. This university offers courses in the fine and performing arts. The Indian Institute of Social Welfare and Business Management was set up in 1953 as the country's first management institute and is also the first in the country to offer an MBA degree of a university. The first, Indian Institute of Technology was set up at Kharagpur about 120 km (75 mi) from Calcutta. In 1960 the Regional Engineering college (presently National Institute of Technology) at Durgapur was set up. It is amongst the top NITs in India and also among the oldest. Indian Institute of Management Calcutta, the first among the Indian Institutes of Management, was set up in 1961 at Joka. It was the first national institute for post-graduate studies and research in management sciences. It was established with the help of the MIT Sloan School of Management and the Ford Foundation.

== Institutes with national or special status ==
Institutes and universities with particular special status or funding arrangements include: Institutes of Eminence (IoE), Institutes of National Importance (INI); central universities, Government Funded Technical Institutes (GFTI); and the deemed universities. Types with specialist functions include research institutes and universities with national recognition for their field of education.

List of institutes and universities with special status or funding
Institution	Location	Status (Type)	Established	Specialisation	Sources
Indian Institute of Management Calcutta	Joka	INI (Autonomous)	1961	Social Sciences and Management	
Indian Institute of Science Education and Research, Kolkata	Haringhata	INI (Autonomous)	2006	Natural sciences	
Indian Statistical Institute	Baranagar	INI (Autonomous)	1959	Basic sciences, applied sciences, social sciences	
Indian Institute of Technology Kharagpur	Kharagpur	IoE; INI (Autonomous)	1951	Science, Management, Engineering & Technology, Law, Medicine	
Indian Institute of Engineering Science and Technology, Shibpur	Howrah	INI (Autonomous)	1856	Sciences, Technology, Engineering, Management	
Indian Institute of Information Technology, Kalyani	Kalyani	INI (Autonomous)	2014	Information Technology	
National Institute of Technology, Durgapur	Durgapur	INI (Autonomous)	1960	Engineering & Technology, Sciences, Management	
Indian Maritime University Kolkata	Taratala	Central University	1949	Meritime studies, Engineering	
National Institute of Pharmaceutical Education and Research, Kolkata	Kolkata	INI (Autonomous)	2007	Pharmacy, Pharmaceutical Engineering	
All India Institute of Medical Sciences, Kalyani	Kalyani	INI (Autonomous)	2019	Medical, Nursing	
Visva-Bharati University	Shantiniketan	INI (Autonomous); Central University	1921	Arts, Sciences, Social Work, Agriculture, Fine arts, Designing, Music, Drama	
Ghani Khan Choudhury Institute of Engineering & Technology	Malda district	GFTI	2010	Engineering	
Indian Association for the Cultivation of Science	Kolkata	Deemed university	1876	Natural sciences	
Ramakrishna Mission Vivekananda Educational and Research Institute	Belur Math	Deemed university	2005	Agricultural Management, Rural Development, Basic Sciences, Indian Culture and Spirituality	
National Institute of Technical Teachers' Training and Research, Kolkata	Kolkata	Deemed university	1965	Engineering & Technology	
Satyajit Ray Film and Television Institute	Kolkata	Deemed university	1995	Film school	
TCG CREST	Kolkata	Deemed university	2020	Research institute	
Status categories: IoE – Institutes of Eminence; INI – Institutes of National Importance; GFTI – Government Funded Technical Institutes

Research institutes and specialist universities
Institution	Location	Status (Type)	Established	Specialisation	Sources
All India Institute of Hygiene and Public Health	Kolkata	Research institute	1932	Hygiene and Public Health	
S. N. Bose National Centre for Basic Sciences	Kolkata	Research institute	1986	Basic and Applied Sciences	
Saha Institute of Nuclear Physics	Kolkata	Research institute	1949	Basic and Applied Sciences	
Bose Institute	Kolkata	Research institute	1917	Basic and Applied Sciences	
Variable Energy Cyclotron Centre	Kolkata	Research institute	1977	Basic and Applied Sciences	
Indian Institute of Chemical Biology	Kolkata	Research institute	1935	Basic and Applied Sciences	
Indian Centre for Space Physics	Kolkata	Research institute	1999	Astronomy, Astrophysics, Space science	
Central Glass and Ceramic Research Institute	Kolkata	Research institute	1950	Basic and Applied Sciences	
Central Inland Fisheries Research Institute	Barrackpore	Research institute	1959	Fishery science	
Central Mechanical Engineering Research Institute	Durgapur	Research institute	1958	Robotics, Mechatronics, Cybernetics, Manufacturing	
Central Research Institute for Jute and Allied Fibers	Barrackpore	Research institute	1953	Jute and Allied Fibers	
Central Sericultural Research and Training Institute	Berhampore	Research institute	1943	Sericultural Research	
National Institute of Biomedical Genomics	Kalyani	Research institute	2009	Basic and Applied Sciences	
National Institute for Research in Bacterial Infections	Kolkata	Research institute	1962	Medical research	
National Institute of Natural Fibre Engineering and Technology	Kolkata	Research institute	1938	Jute and Allied Fibres	
West Bengal National University of Juridical Sciences	Kolkata	National Law University	1999	Law	

== Universities, state and private ==
Universities in India may be public or private. Other than the central universities – of which there is one in West Bengal – public universities are funded by the state government. Non-government universities are privately funded. Public state universities are listed in the first table shown below, with private universities in a separate second table below that.

List of state universities
University	Location	Type	Established	Specialisation	Sources
Aliah University	Kolkata	State	1780	Arts, Sciences, Engineering, Management, Islamic Studies	
Alipurduar University	Alipurduar	State	2020	Arts, Sciences, Commerce	
Baba Saheb Ambedkar Education University	Kolkata	State	2015	Teachers Training, B.Ed. M.Ed	
Bankura University	Bankura	State	2014	Arts, Sciences, Law	
Bidhan Chandra Krishi Viswavidyalaya	Nadia	State	1974	Agriculture, Horticulture and Agricultural Engineering	
Biswa Bangla Biswabidyalay	Bolpur	State	2020	Arts, Sciences	
University of Burdwan	Purba Bardhaman	State	1960	Arts, Sciences, Commerce, Engineering and Law	
University of Calcutta	Kolkata	State	1857	Arts, Sciences, Commerce, Engineering and Law	
Cooch Behar Panchanan Barma University	Cooch Behar	State	2012	Arts, Sciences	
Dakshin Dinajpur University	Dakshin Dinajpur	State	2021	Arts, Sciences	
Darjeeling Hills University	Darjeeling	State	2021	Arts, Sciences	
Diamond Harbour Women's University	Diamond Harbour	State	2013	Humanities and Basic Sciences	
University of Gour Banga	Malda	State	2008	Arts, Sciences, and Commerce	
Harichand Guruchand University	North 24 Parganas	State	2019	Arts, Sciences, and Management	
Hindi University	Howrah	State	2019	Languages	
Jadavpur University	Jadavpur	State; Autonomous	1955	Engineering, Technology, Science, Arts and Commerce	
University of Kalyani	Kalyani	State	1960	Arts, Sciences, Commerce and Law	
Kanyashree University	Krishnanagar	State	2020	Arts, Sciences, and Commerce	
Kazi Nazrul University	Asansol	State	2012	Arts, Sciences, Engineering, Law and Commerce	
Mahatma Gandhi University	Mahishadal	State	2020	Arts, Sciences	
Maulana Abul Kalam Azad University of Technology	Kolkata	State	2000	Engineering, Management, Architecture	
Murshidabad Maharaja Krishnanath University	Murshidabad	State	2020	Arts, Sciences	
Netaji Subhas Open University	Kolkata	State and distance education	1998	Arts, Sciences, and Commerce	
University of North Bengal	Siliguri	State	1962	Arts, Sciences, Commerce, and Law	
Presidency University	Kolkata	State	1817	Arts and Sciences	
Rabindra Bharati University	Kolkata	State	1962	Arts, Fine Arts, and Performing Arts	
Raiganj University	Raiganj	State	2015	Humanities, Science	
Rani Rashmoni Green University	Tarakeswar	State	2020	Science, Environmental Science	
Sadhu Ramchand Murmu University of Jhargram	Jhargram	State	2020	Arts, Science	
Senate of Serampore College (University)	Serampore	State	1818	Theology	
Sidho Kanho Birsha University	Purulia	State	2010	Arts and Sciences	
The Sanskrit College and University	Kolkata	State	2015	English, Sanskrit, Linguistics, Philosophy, Pali, Languages, AIWH	
Uttar Banga Krishi Vishwavidyalaya	Cooch Behar	State	2001	Agriculture, Horticulture	
Vidyasagar University	Midnapore	State	1981	Arts, Sciences, Commerce and Law	
West Bengal State University	Barasat	State	2008	Arts, Sciences, Commerce and Law	
West Bengal University of Animal and Fishery Sciences	Kolkata	State	1995	Veterinary & Animal Sciences	
West Bengal University of Health Sciences	Kolkata	State	2003	Medicine, Pharmacy, Nursing, Allied Health Sciences	

List of private universities
University	Location	Type	Est.	Specialisation	Sources
Adamas University	Barasat	Private	2014	Sciences, Management, Humanities, Engineering & Technology	
Amity University, Kolkata	New Town	Global Private	2015	Sciences, Management, Humanities, Engineering & Technology	
Brainware University	Kolkata	Private	2015	Engineering & Technology, Agriculture, Sciences, Management, Law, Pharmacy, Nursing, Humanities, Psychology	
International Management Institute Kolkata	Kolkata	Autonomous Management Institute	2011	Management	
JIS University	Agarpara	Private	2014	Science, Engineering & Technology, Pharmacy, Management, Law	
The Neotia University	Sarisha	Private	2015	Sciences, Management, Agriculture, Humanities, Engineering & Technology	
Seacom Skills University	Santiniketan (Bolpur)	Private	2014	Sciences, Engineering & Technology	
Sister Nivedita University	New Town	Private	2017	Science, Engineering & Technology, Management, Social Science & Women Studies	
St. Xavier's University, Kolkata	Kolkata	Private	2017	Management, Commerce, Humanities, Law, Mass Communication	
Swami Vivekananda University, Barrackpore	Barrackpore	Private	2020	Science, Engineering & Technology, Management, Social Science & Women Studies	
Techno India University	Kolkata	Private	2012	Sciences, Management, Engineering & Technology	
University of Engineering & Management (UEM), Kolkata	New Town	Private	2015	Engineering, Technology & Management	

== Medical and dental colleges ==
=== Medical ===
There are several types of medical colleges in West Bengal with funding from different sources. Of the thirty-three listed below, nine are privately funded, and twenty-three are state government-funded. One is centrally-funded and -administered by the Indian Ministry of Labour and Employment through the autonomous Employees' State Insurance Corporation (ESIC). The West Bengal University of Health Sciences (WBUHS) is the affiliating university with jurisdiction for medical colleges in the state.

List of government and private medical colleges
Name	Est.	City	University	Type	Intake places	Ref.
All India Institute of Medical Sciences, Kalyani	2019	Kalyani	Autonomous	Centrally funded	125	
Bankura Sammilani Medical College	1956	Bankura	WBUHS	State		
Barasat Government Medical College and Hospital	2022	Barasat	WBUHS	State		
Burdwan Medical College	1969	Bardhaman	WBUHS	State		
Calcutta National Medical College	1948	Kolkata	WBUHS	State		
College Of Medicine & JNM Hospital	2009	Kalyani	WBUHS	State		
College of Medicine & Sagore Dutta Hospital	2010	Kolkata	WBUHS	State		
Deben Mahata Government Medical College and Hospital	2020	Purulia	WBUHS	State		
Diamond Harbour Government Medical College and Hospital	2019	Diamond Harbour	WBUHS	State		
Dr B C Roy Institute of Medical Sciences & Research	2018	Kharagpur	IIT Kharagpur	Centrally funded		
Dr. B C Roy Post Graduate Institute of Paediatric Sciences	2010	Kolkata	WBUHS	State		Only PG courses
East West Institute of Medical Sciences and Research	2024	Burdwan	WBUHS	Private	50	
ESIC Medical College, Kolkata	2013	Joka	WBUHS	Centrally funded	125	
Gouri Devi Institute of Medical Sciences and Hospital	2016	Durgapur	WBUHS	Private	150	
ICARE Institute of Medical Sciences and Research	2011	Haldia	WBUHS	Private	150	
IPGMER and SSKM Hospital	1957	Kolkata	WBUHS	State		
IQ City Medical College	2013	Durgapur	WBUHS	Private	200	
Jagannath Gupta Institute of Medical Sciences and Hospital	2016	Budge Budge, Kolkata	WBUHS	Private	200	
Jakir Hossain Medical College and Research Institute	2024	Jangipur, Murshidabad	WBUHS	Private	50	
Jalpaiguri Government Medical College and Hospital	2022	Jalpaiguri	WBUHS	State		
Jhargram Government Medical College and Hospital	2021	Jhargram	WBUHS	State		
JIS School of Medical Science and Research	2023	Howrah	JIS University	Private	150	
JMN Medical College	2022	Chakdaha	WBUHS	Private	150	
KPC Medical College and Hospital	2006	Jadavpur, Kolkata	WBUHS	Private	150	
Krishnanagar Institute of Medical Science	2024	Krishnanagar, Nadia	WBUHS	Private	100	
Maharaja Jitendra Narayan Medical College and Hospital	2018	Coochbehar	WBUHS	State		
Malda Medical College and Hospital	2011	Malda	WBUHS	State		
Medical College and Hospital, Kolkata	1835	Kolkata	WBUHS	State		
Midnapore Medical College and Hospital	2004	Midnapore	WBUHS	State		
Murshidabad Medical College and Hospital	2012	Berhampore	WBUHS	State		
Nil Ratan Sarkar Medical College and Hospital	1873	Kolkata	WBUHS	State		
North Bengal Medical College and Hospital	1968	Siliguri	WBUHS	State		
PKG Medical College and Hospital	2025	Rajarhat	WBUHS	Private		
Prafulla Chandra Sen Government Medical College and Hospital	2022	Arambagh	WBUHS	State		
R. G. Kar Medical College and Hospital	1886	Kolkata	WBUHS	State		
Raiganj Government Medical College and Hospital	2018	Raiganj	WBUHS	State		
Rampurhat Government Medical College and Hospital	2018	Rampurhat	WBUHS	State		
Raniganj Medical College and Hospital	2025	Raniganj	WBUHS	Private		
Santiniketan Medical College	2021	Santiniketan	WBUHS	Private	150	
Sarat Chandra Chattopadhyay Government Medical College and Hospital	2022	Uluberia	WBUHS	State		
Shri Ramkrishna Institute of Medical Sciences and Sanaka Hospital	2015	Durgapur	WBUHS	Private	200	
Tamralipto Government Medical College and Hospital	2022	Tamluk	WBUHS	State		
Vivekananda Institute of Medical Sciences	1963	Kolkata	WBUHS	Private		

=== Dental ===
- Dr. R. Ahmed Dental College and Hospital
- Burdwan Dental College and Hospital
- North Bengal Dental College and Hospital
- Guru Nanak Institute of Dental Sciences and Research
- Haldia Institute of Dental Sciences and Research
- Kusum Devi Sunderlal Dugar Jain Dental College and Hospital

== AYUSH institutions ==
AYUSH institutions provide training in alternative medicine and traditional health care systems of South Asia (ayurveda, yoga and naturopathy, Unani, Siddha, Sowa Rigpa, and homeopathy). These systems are governed in India by the ministry of Ayush.

=== Homeopathic ===
List of homeopathic colleges
Institution	Location	Support	Established	Affiliation	Ref.
Bengal Homoeopathic Medical College and Hospital	Asansol	Private	1980	WBUHS	
Birbhum Vivekananda Homoeopathic Medical College & Hospital	Sainthia	Private	1972	WBUHS	
Burdwan Homoeopathic Medical College & Hospital	Burdwan	Private	1978	WBUHS	
Calcutta Homoeopathic Medical College & Hospital	Kolkata	State	1881	WBUHS	
D.N. De Homoeopathic Medical College & Hospital	Kolkata	State	1927	WBUHS	
Kharagpur Homoeopathic Medical College and Hospital	Kharagpur	Private	1971	WBUHS	
Mahesh Bhattacharya Homoeopathic Medical College and Hospital	Howrah	State	1967	WBUHS	
Metropolitan Homoeopathic Medical College & Hospital	Sodepur	Private	1972	WBUHS	
Midnapore Homoeopathic Medical College and Hospital	Paschim Medinipur	State	1945	WBUHS	
National Institute of Homoeopathy	Bidhannagar	Central Funded	1975	WBUHS	
Netai Charan Chakravarty Homoeopathic Medical College & Hospital	Howrah	Private	1983	WBUHS	
Pratap Chandra Memorial Homoeopathic Hospital & College	Kolkata	State	1923	WBUHS	

=== Ayurvedic ===
Government Funded:

- J.B. Roy State Ayurvedic Medical College & Hospital
- Institute of Post Graduate Ayurvedic Education & Research.
- Vishwanath Ayurved Mahavidyalaya & Hospital

Privately Funded:

- Rajib Gandhi Ayurvedic Medical College & Hospital.
- Raghunath Ayurved Mahavidyalaya and Hospital.

=== Unani ===
- Calcutta Unani Medical College and Hospital

=== Sowa-Rigpa ===
- Chagpori Tibetan Medical Institute

== Allied Health Sciences Institutions ==
- State Medical Faculty of West Bengal
- College of Paramedical & Allied Health Sciences WBUHS, Kalyani , Nadia

== Engineering universities and colleges ==
List of Engineering Universities
Name	Est.	City	Affiliation	Type	Degrees Offered (Engineering Only)	Ref.
IIT Kharagpur	1951	Kharagpur	Ministry of Education, Government of India	Public	B.Tech., M.Tech., Ph.D.	
NIT Durgapur	1960	Durgapur	Ministry of Education, Government of India	Public	B.Tech., M.Tech., Ph.D.	
IIEST Shibpur	1856	Howrah	Ministry of Education, Government of India	Public	B.Tech., M.Tech., Ph.D.	
ISI Kolkata	1931	Kolkata	MoSPI, Government of India	Public	M.Tech., Ph.D.	
IIIT Kalyani	2014	Kalyani	Ministry of Education, Government of India, Government of West Bengal, Coal India	Semi-Public	B.Tech., M.Tech., Ph.D.	
Jadavpur University	1955	Kolkata	Government of West Bengal	Public	B.E., M.E., Ph.D.	
UCSTA Calcutta	1914	Kolkata	Calcutta University, Government of West Bengal	Public	B.Tech., M.Tech.	
UIT Burdwan	1999	Burdwan	Burdwan University, Government of West Bengal	Public	B.E., M.E.	
Kalyani University	1960	Kalyani	Government of West Bengal	Public	B.Tech., M.Tech.	
Bidhan Chandra Krishi Viswavidyalaya	1974	Mohanpur	Government of West Bengal	Public	B.Tech., M.Tech., Ph.D.	
Uttar Banga Krishi Viswavidyalaya	2001	Pundibari	Government of West Bengal	Public	B.Tech.	
West Bengal University of Animal and Fishery Sciences	1995	Mohanpur	Government of West Bengal	Public	B.Tech., M.Tech., Ph.D.	
Maulana Abul Kalam Azad University of Technology	2001	Haringhata	Government of West Bengal	Public	B.Tech., M.Tech., Ph.D.	
Kazi Nazrul University	2012	Asansol	Government of West Bengal	Public	B.Tech.	
Aliah University	2008	Kolkata	Government of West Bengal	Public	B.Tech., M.Tech., Ph.D.	
Ghani Khan Choudhury Institute of Engineering & Technology	2010	Malda	Ministry of Education, Government of India	Public	B.Tech., Diploma	
Adamas University	2014	Barasat	AICTE	Private	B.Tech., M.Tech., Ph.D.	
University of Engineering & Management, Kolkata	2015	Kolkata	AICTE	Private	B.Tech., M.Tech., Ph.D.	
JIS University	2014	Agarpara	AICTE	Private	B.Tech., M.Tech., Ph.D.	
Seacom Skills University	2014	Bolpur	AICTE	Private	B.Tech., M.Tech.	
Sister Nivedita University	2017	Kolkata	AICTE	Private	B.Tech., M.Tech., Ph.D.	
Swami Vivekananda University, Barrackpore	2020	Barrackpore	AICTE	Private	B.Tech., M.Tech.	
Techno India University	2012	Salt Lake Sector-V	AICTE	Private	B.Tech., M.Tech., Ph.D.	

List of state government-funded engineering colleges
Name	Established	Location	Type	Ref
Alipurduar Government Engineering and Management College	2023	Alipurduar	State	
Cooch Behar Government Engineering College	2016	Cooch Behar	State	
Government College of Engineering and Leather Technology	1919	Salt Lake City, Kolkata	State	
Government College of Engineering & Textile Technology	1927	Berhampore, Murshidabad	State	
Government College of Engineering and Ceramic Technology	1941	Kolkata	State	
Government College of Engineering & Textile Technology	1908	Serampore, Hooghly district	State	
Jalpaiguri Government Engineering College	1961	Jalpaiguri	State	
Kalyani Government Engineering College	1995	Kalyani, Nadia	State	
Ramkrishna Mahato Government Engineering College	2016	Joypur, Purulia	State	

List of public-private partnership engineering colleges
Name	Established	Location	Type	Ref
Darjeeling Hill Institute of Technology and Management	2025	Takdah, Darjeeling	PPP Mode	

List of private engineering colleges
	Institution
Abacus Institute of Engineering & Management, Mogra in the district of Hooghly
Academy of Technology, Adisaptagram, in the district of Hooghly
Asansol Engineering College, Asansol, Paschim Bardhaman
B. P. Poddar Institute of Management & Technology, Kolkata
Bankura Unnayini Institute of Engineering, Bankura
Bengal College of Engineering & Technology, Durgapur, Paschim Bardhaman
Bengal Institute of Technology & Management, Santiniketan, Birbhum
Bengal Institute of Technology, Dhapa, Kolkata
Birbhum Institute of Engineering and Technology, Suri, Birbhum
Budge Budge Institute of Technology, Budge Budge
Calcutta Institute of Engineering and Management, Tollygunj, Kolkata
Calcutta Institute of Technology, Uluberia, Howrah
Camellia Institute of Engineering and Technology, Burdwan
Camellia Institute of Technology and Management, Bainchi, in the district of Hooghly
Camellia Institute of Technology, Madhyamgram, North 24 Parganas
Camellia School of Engineering & Technology, Barasat, North 24 Parganas
College of Engineering and Management, Kolaghat, Purba Medinipur
Dr. B. C. Roy Engineering College, Durgapur, Paschim Bardhaman
Dr . Sudhir Chandra Sur Institute of Technology and Sports Complex, Dum Dum, North 24 Parganas
Dream Institute of Technology, Thakurpukur, Kolkata
Dumkal Institute of Engineering and Technology, Dumkal, Murshidabad
Durgapur Institute of Advanced Technology and Management, Durgapur, Paschim Bardhaman
Elitte College of Engineering, Sodepur, North 24 Parganas
Future Institute of Engineering and Management, Sonarpur, South 24 Parganas
Future Institute of Technology, Garia, South 24 Parganas
Gargi Memorial Institute of Technology, Baruipur, South 24 Parganas
Global Institute of Management and Technology, Krishnanagar, Nadia
Greater Kolkata College of Engineering and Management, Baruipur, South 24 Parganas
Guru Nanak Institute of Technology, Panihati, North 24 Parganas
Haldia Institute of Technology, Haldia, Purba Medinipur
Hemnalini Memorial College of Engineering, Haringhata, Nadia district
Heritage Institute of Technology, Kolkata
Hooghly Engineering and Technology College, Hooghly in Hooghly district
Ideal Institute of Engineering, Kalyani, Nadia
IMPS College of Engineering and Technology, Malda
Institute of Engineering and Management, Salt Lake, Kolkata
Institute of Science and Technology, Paschim Medinipur
JIS College of Engineering, Kalyani, Nadia
JLD Engineering and Management College, Baruipur, South 24 Parganas
Kanad Institute of Engineering and Management, Mankar, Purba Bardhaman
Mallabhum Institute of Technology, Bishnupur, Bankura
MCKV Institute of Technology, Liluah, Howrah
Meghnad Saha Institute of Technology, Kolkata
Modern Institute of Engineering and Technology, Bandel, Hooghly
Murshidabad College of Engineering and Technology, Murshidabad
Narula Institute of Technology, Agarpara, North 24 Parganas
Neotia Institute of Technology Management and Science, Diamond Harbour Road, Amira, South 24 Parganas
Netaji Subhash Engineering College, Garia, South 24 Parganas
NSHM Knowledge Campus, Durgapur and Kolkata
Om Dayal Group of Institutions, Uluberia, Howrah
Pailan College of Management and Technology, Joka, South 24 Parganas
RCC Institute of Information Technology, Kolkata
Regent Education and Research Foundation, Barasat, North 24 Parganas
Sanaka Education Trusts Group of Institutions, Durgapur, Paschim Bardhaman
Seacom Engineering College, Sankrail, Howrah
Siliguri Institute of Technology, Siliguri, Darjeeling
St. Mary's Technical Campus, Barasat, North 24 Parganas
St. Thomas College of Engineering and Technology, Khidirpur, Kolkata
Supreme Knowledge Foundation Group of Institutions, Mankundu, Hooghly district
Swami Vivekananda Institute of Science and Technology, Sonarpur, South 24 Parganas
Surendra Institute of Engineering and Management, Siliguri, Darjeeling
Techno Engineering College, Banipur, North 24 Parganas
Techno International, Batanagar, South 24 Parganas
Techno International, Rajarhat, North 24 Parganas
Techno Main, Sector V, Salt Lake, North 24 Parganas

== Government degree colleges ==
Government general degree colleges (GGDC) are public educational institutes set up and administered under the University Grants Commission (UGC). State or union governments manage them, but the colleges are affiliated to a university for their course structure.

- General General Degree College, Ranibandh
- Kabi Jagadram Roy Govt. General Degree College
- Government General Degree College, Mangalkote
- Government General Degree College, Kalna
- Government General Degree College, Pedong
- Government General Degree College, Gorubathan
- Government General Degree College, Mohanpur
- Government General Degree College, Kharagpur-II
- Government General Degree College, Gopiballavpur-II
- Government General Degree College, Keshiary
- Sahid Matangini Hazra Government College for Women
- Muragachha GOVT College
- Government General Degree College, Kaliganj
- Government General Degree College, Tehatta
- Government General Degree College, Chapra
- Government General Degree College, Hili
- Government General Degree College, Kushmandi
- Sister Nibedita Government General Degree College for Girls
- Nayagram Pandit Raghunath Murmu Government College
- Government General Degree College, Lalgarh
- Government General Degree College, Salboni
- Jhargram Raj College (Girls' Wing)
- Government General Degree College, Singur
- Dr. A.P.J. Abdul Kalam Govt. College, Newtown
- P. R. Thakur Government College
- Banarhat Kartik Oraon Hindi Government College
- Government Girls General Degree College, Ekbalpur
- Lady Brabourne College – Kolkata
- Acharya Brojendra Nath Seal College
- Acharya Prafulla Chandra Roy Government College
- Barasat Government College
- Bethune College
- Bidhannagar College
- Chandernagore Government College
- Durgapur Government College
- Maulana Azad College
- Darjeeling Government College
- Goenka College of Commerce and Business Administration
- Taki Government College
- Hooghly Mohsin College
- Haldia Government College
- Jhargram Raj College
- Krishnagar Government College
- Government College of Art & Craft
- The Sanskrit College
- Government General Degree College, Narayangarh

== General colleges affiliated with universities ==
=== With Burdwan University ===
- Aghorekamini Prakashchandra Mahavidyalaya, Bengai, Arambagh
- Arambagh Girls' College
- Bardhaman Raj College
- Bejoy Narayan Mahavidyalaya, Itachuna
- Birbhum Mahavidyalaya
- Bolpur College
- Galsi Mahavidyalaya
- Government General Degree College, Mangalkote
- Gushkara Mahavidyalaya
- Hooghly Mohsin College
- Hooghly Women's College
- Kabi Joydeb Mahavidyalaya
- Kalna College
- Katwa College
- Maharajadhiraj Uday Chand Women's College
- Mankar College
- Memari College
- Netaji Mahavidyalaya, Arambagh
- Purni Devi Chaudhuri Girls' College, Bolpur
- Syamsundar College
- Tarakeswar Degree College
- Vivekananda Mahavidyalaya
- Kandra Radha Kanta Kundu Mahavidyalaya
- Purbasthali College‚ Purbasthali

=== With University of Calcutta ===
- Acharya Jagadish Chandra Bose College
- Anandamohan College
- Asutosh College
- Bangabasi College
- Baruipur College
- Basanti Devi College
- Bethune College
- Budge Budge College
- Dhruba Chand Halder College
- Dinabandhu Andrews College
- Fakir Chand College
- Jogamaya Devi College
- Lady Brabourne College
- L.J.D. College, Falta
- Maheshtala College
- Maulana Azad College
- Netaji Nagar College
- Netaji Nagar College for Women
- Netaji Nagar Day College
- Ramakrishna Mission Residential College, Narendrapur (Autonomous), Narendrapur
- Ramakrishna Mission Vidyamandira (Autonomous), Belur
- St. Xavier's College, Kolkata
- Scottish Church College
- Serampore College
- Sonarpur Mahavidyalaya
- Vijaygarh Jyotish Ray College
- Bangabasi Morning College
- Vivekananda College, Thakurpukur
- Vidyasagar College

=== With University of Kalyani ===
- Krishnath College
- Asannagar Madan Mohan Tarkalankar College
- Berhampore College
- Berhampore Girls' College
- Bethuadahari College
- Chakdaha College
- Chapra Bangaljhi Mahavidyalaya
- Domkal Girls' College
- Dr. B.R. Ambedkar College
- Dukhulal Nibaran Chandra College
- Dumkal College
- Dwijendralal College
- Santipur College
- G. D. College, Shaikhpara
- Murshidabad Adarsha Mahavidyalaya, Islampur
- Kalyani Mahavidyalaya

=== With Kazi Nazrul University ===
- Asansol Girls' College
- Banwarilal Bhalotia College
- Bidhan Chandra College, Asansol
- St. Xavier's College, Asansol
- Kulti College
- Deshbandhu Mahavidyalaya
- Kazi Nazrul Islam Mahavidyalaya
- Triveni Devi Bhalotia College
- Raniganj Girls' College
- Durgapur Government College
- Michael Madhusudan Memorial College
- Durgapur Women's College
- Durgapur College of Commerce and Science
- Khandra College
- Pandaveswar College

=== With Bankura University ===
- Bankura Christian College
- Bankura Sammilani College
- Bankura Zilla Saradamani Mahila Mahavidyapith
- Barjora College
- Ramananda College
- Sonamukhi College

=== With Vidyasagar University ===
- Bajkul Milani Mahavidyalaya
- Belda College
- Kharagpur College
- Mahishadal Girls' College
- Midnapore College
- Panskura Banamali College
- Prabhat Kumar College
- Tamralipta Mahavidyalaya
- Jhargram Raj College
- Seva Bharati Mahavidyalaya
- Egra Sarada Shashi Bhushan College

=== With West Bengal State University ===
- Ramakrishna Sarada Mission Vivekananda Vidyabhavan, Dumdum
- Acharya Prafulla Chandra College
- Barasat Government College
- Barrackpore Rastraguru Surendranath College
- Basirhat College
- Bidhannagar College
- Dum Dum Motijheel College
- Gobardanga Hindu College
- P. R. Thakur Government College
- Shree Chaitanya College, Habra
- Banipur Mahila Mahavidyalaya, Habra
- Netaji Satabarshiki Mahabidyalay, Ashoknagar
- Panihati Mahavidyalaya, Sodepur
- Rishi Bankim Chandra College for Women, Naihati
- Rishi Bankim Chandra Evening College, Naihati
- Rishi Bankim Chandra College, Naihati

== List of colleges by districts ==
=== Alipurduar ===
- Birpara College
- Falakata College
- Sahid Kshudiram Mahavidyalaya
- Vivekananda College, Alipurduar
- Lilabati Mahavidyalaya
- Pijushkanti Mukherjee Mahavidyalaya
- Samuktala Sidhu Kanhu College
- Alipurduar Mahila Mahavidyalaya
- Nani Bhattacharya Smarak Mahavidyalaya

=== Bankura ===
- Bankura Unnayani Institute of Engineering
- Raipur Government Polytechnic
- Bankura Government Polytechnic
- Mallabhum Institute of Technology
- Bankura Christian College
- Bankura Sammilani College
- Bankura Zilla Saradamani Mahila Mahavidyapith
- Jamini Roy College, Bankura
- Ramananda College, Bishnupur, Bankura
- Barjora College
- Panchmura Mahavidyalaya, Panchmura
- Pandit Raghunath Murmu Smriti Mahavidyalaya, Baragari
- Indas Mahavidyalaya, Indas
- Raipur Block Mahavidyalaya
- Khatra Adibasi Mahavidyalaya
- Saldiha College
- Birsha Munda Memorial College
- Chatra Ramai Pandit Mahavidyalaya
- Chhatna Chandidas Mahavidyalaya
- Gobindaprasad Mahavidyalaya
- Onda Thana Mahavidyalaya
- Patrasayer Mahavidyalaya
- Saltora Netaji Centenary College
- Sonamukhi College
- Swami Dhananjoy Das Kathiababa Mahavidyalaya
- Government General Degree College, Mejia
- Akui Kamalabala Women's College

=== Birbhum ===
- Birbhum Mahavidyalaya, Birbhum
- Suri Vidyasagar College
- Sambhunath College, Labpur
- Krishna Chandra College
- Bolpur College, Bolpur
- Purni Devi Chaudhuri Girls' College, Bolpur
- Rampurhat College, Rampurhat
- Hiralal Bhakat College, Nalhati
- Kabi Nazrul College, Murarai
- Sofia Girls College, Nalhati
- Asleha Girl's College, Nalhati
- Gurukul Teachers Training College, Rampurhat
- Helal B.Ed College, Math Kolitha, Nalhati
- Gitanjali College of Education, Lohapur
- Birbhum Pharmacy School, Dubarajpur

=== Cooch Behar ===
In Cooch Behar:

- Acharya Brojendra Nath Seal College
- Bakshirhat Mahavidyalaya
- Baneswar Sarathibala Mahavidyalaya
- Cooch Behar College
- Dinhata College
- Government College of Physical Education for Women, Dinhata
- Madhusudan Hore Mahavidyalaya, Nishiganj
- Mathabhanga College
- Mekhliganj college
- Netaji Subhas Mahavidyalaya
- Sitalkuchi College
- Thakur Panchanan Mahila Mahavidyalaya
- Tufanganj Mahavidyalaya
- University B.T. & Evening College
- Ghoksadanga Birendranath Mahavidyalaya
- Bakshirhat Mahavidyalaya
- Dewanhat Mahavidyalaya
- Cooch Behar Government Engineering College
- Cooch Behar Polytechnic
- Uttar Banga Krishi Viswavidyalaya

=== Dakshin Dinajpur ===
- Balurghat College
- Balurghat Mahila Mahavidyalaya
- Jamini Majumdar Memorial College
- Gangarampur College
- Gangarampur Government Polytechnic
- Gangarampur B.Ed College
- Buniadpur Mahavidyalaya

=== Darjeeling ===
Within Darjeeling:

- Inspiria Knowledge Campus
- Bijanbari College
- Darjeeling Government College
- Ghoom-Jorebunglow Degree College
- Ghoshpukur College
- Gyan Jyoti College
- Kalipada Ghosh Tarai Mahavidyalaya
- Kurseong College
- Munshi Premchand Mahavidyalaya
- Nakshalbari College
- North Bengal Medical College and Hospital
- St Joseph's College, Darjeeling
- Salesian College, Darjeeling
- Salesian College, Siliguri
- Siliguri College
- Siliguri College of Commerce
- Siliguri Mahila Mahavidyalaya
- Sonada Degree College
- Southfield College
- Surya Sen Mahavidyalaya
- Siliguri Institute of Technology
- Indian Institute of Legal Studies

=== Hooghly ===
- Sri Ramkrishna Sarada Vidyamahapitha
- Saroj Mohan Institute of Technology Guptipara
- Raja Peary Mohan College
- Tarakeswar Degree College, Hooghly
- Rabindra Mahavidyalaya, Champadanga, Hooghly
- Hooghly Engineering and Technology College
- Hooghly Mohsin College
- Hooghly Women's College
- Serampore College, Serampore
- Chandernagore Government College, Chandannagore
- Mahitosh Nandy Mahavidyalaya, Jangipara
- Bejoy Narayan Mahavidyalaya, Itachuna
- Nabagram Hiralal Paul College, Konnagar
- Bidhan Chandra College, Rishra
- Netaji Mahavidyalaya, Arambagh
- Arambagh Girls' College, Arambagh
- Sreegopal Banerjee College, Mogra
- Aghorekamini Prakashchandra Mahavidyalaya, Bengai, Arambagh
- Vivekananda Mahavidyalaya, Haripal, Haripal
- Government General Degree College, Singur

=== Howrah ===
In Howrah:

- Ramakrishna Mission Vidyamandira, Belur Math
- Bijoy Krishna Girls' College
- Dinabandhu Institution
- Narasinha Dutt College
- Dr. Kanailal Bhattacharya College Ramrajatala, Howrah
- Lalbaba College
- Azad Hind Fouz Smriti Mahavidyalaya, Domjur
- Sovarani Memorial College, Jagatballavpur, Howrah
- Ramsaday College, Amta
- Uluberia College, Uluberia
- Bagnan College, Bagnan
- Prabhu Jagatbandhu College, Andul
- Shyampur Siddheswari Mahavidyalaya, Shyampur I
- Bagnan Teacher's Training College, Bagnan

=== Jalpaiguri ===
In Jalpaiguri:

- Ananda Chandra College
- Ananda Chandra College of Commerce
- Dhupguri Girl's College
- Government College of Engineering
- Maynaguri College, Maynaguri
- Nani Bhattacharya Smarak Mahavidyalaya
- North Bengal St. Xavier's College
- P.D. Women's College
- Parimal Mitra Smriti Mahavidyalaya
- Rajganj College
- Sukanta Mahavidyalaya
- Jalpaiguri Law College
- Jalpaiguri Polytechnic Institute
- Institute of Pharmacy, Jalpaiguri
- Rajganj Government Polytechnic
- Maynaguri Government Polytechnic
- Jalpaiguri Institute of Technology
- Banarhat Kartik Oraon Hindi Government College
- Jalpaiguri Government Medical College and Hospital
- Ananda Chandra Training College

=== Jhargram ===
- Sevayatan Sikshan Mahavidyalaya
- Government General Degree College, Gopiballavpur-II, Beliaberah
- Jhargram Raj College
- Jhargram Government Medical College and Hospital
- Keshiary Government College
- Lalgarh Government College
- Nayagram Pandit Raghunath Murmu Government College
- Sankrail Anil Biswas Smriti Mahavidyalaya
- Seva Bharati Mahavidyalaya
- Silda Chandra Sekhar College
- Subarnarekha Mahavidyalaya
- Vivekananda Satavarshiki Mahavidyalaya

=== Kalimpong ===
- Cluny Women's College
- Kalimpong College
- Rockvale Management College
- Government General Degree College, Gorubathan
- Government General Degree College, Pedong

=== Kolkata ===
- Acharya Jagadish Chandra Bose College
- Anandamohan College
- Asutosh College
- Brainware Group of Institutions
- B. P. Poddar Institute of Management & Technology
- Bangabasi College
- Basanti Devi College
- Bengal Institute of Technology, Kolkata
- Bethune College
- Bharatiya Vidya Bhavan Institute of Management Science, Salt Lake
- Bhawanipur Education Society College
- Bidhan Nagar College, Salt Lake
- Brahmananda Keshab Chandra College Bonhooghly, Dunlop
- Calcutta Institute of Engineering and Management
- Calcutta National Medical College
- City College, Kolkata
- College of Engineering and Management, Kolaghat
- Derozio Memorial College
- Dinabandhu Andrews College
- Dum Dum Motijheel College
- Future Institute of Engineering and Management, Sonarpur
- Government College of Engineering and Ceramic Technology
- Government College of Art & Craft
- Heritage Institute of Technology, Kolkata
- International Management Institute
- Institute of Engineering and Management
- IPGMER and SSKM Hospital
- Institute of Technology and Marine Engineering
- iLead, Kolkata
- Jogamaya Devi College
- Jogesh Chandra Chaudhuri Law College
- Lady Brabourne College, Kolkata
- Loreto College, Kolkata
- Marine Engineering and Research Institute
- Maulana Azad College
- Medical College and Hospital, Kolkata
- Meghnad Saha Institute of Technology
- National Institute of Fashion Technology
- National Institute of Planning Management, Kolkata
- New Alipore College
- Netaji Nagar College for Women, Kolkata
- Netaji Nagar Day College, Kolkata
- Netaji Nagar College (Evening)
- Netaji Subhash Engineering College
- Nil Ratan Sircar Medical College and Hospital
- NIPS School of Hotel Management
- Nopany Institute for Professional Studies
- NSHM Knowledge Campus, Kolkata
- Pailan College of Management and Technology, Joka, Kolkata
- Prasanta Chandra Mahalanobis Mahavidyalaya
- Rajabazar Science College
- Ramakrishna Mission Residential College, Narendrapur
- RCC Institute of Information Technology
- R. G. Kar Medical College and Hospital
- Sanaka Educational Trust Group of Institutions
- Scottish Church College, Kolkata
- Sabita Devi Education Trust- Brainware Group of Institutions
- St. Paul's Cathedral Mission College
- St. Thomas' College of Engineering and Technology
- St. Xavier's College, Kolkata (Autonomous)
- Surendranath College
- Techno India, Salt Lake
- Techno India College of Technology, Rajarhat
- The Heritage Academy, Kolkata
- Vivekananda College, Thakurpukur
- Vivekananda College for Women, Barisha
- Vidyasagar College
- Vidyasagar College for Women
- Vijaygarh Jyotish Ray College
- Victoria Institution

=== Malda ===
- Chanchal College
- Ghani Khan Choudhury Institute of Engineering & Technology
- Gazole Mahavidyalaya
- Gour Mahavidyalaya, Maldah
- Government Teachers' Training College, Malda
- Kaliachak College
- Kaliachak Government Polytechnic
- Malda College
- Manikchak College
- Pakuahat Degree College
- Samsi College
- South Malda College
- IMPS College of Engineering and Technology

=== Murshidabad ===
- Sewnarayan Rameswar Fatepuria College, Beldanga
- Berhampore College
- Murshidabad College of Engineering & Technology, Baharampur
- Krishnath College
- Berhampore Girls' College
- Kandi Raj College
- Muzaffar Ahmed Mahavidyalaya, Salar, Murshidabad, Bharatpur II
- Sripat Singh College, Jiaganj
- Rani Dhanya Kumari College, Jiaganj
- Nagar College
- Raja Birendra Chandra College
- Sagardighi Kamada Kinkar Smriti Mahavidyalaya
- Prof. Syed Nurul Hasan College
- Raja Birendra Chandra College of Law
- Hazi A. K. Khan College, Hariharpara
- Jakir Hossain Polytechnic College,
- Jangipur College
- Dumkal Girls College
- Dukhulal Nibaranchandra College, Aurangabad
- Murshidabad Adarsha Mahavidyalaya, Islampur
- G D College, Shaikhpara
- Dumkal College, Basantapur
- Dumkal Institute of Engineering & Technology, Dumkal

=== Nadia district ===
Located in Nadia district:

- Asannagar Madan Mohan Tarkalankar College
- Bethuadahari College
- Chakdaha College
- Chapra Bangaljhi Mahavidyalaya
- Chapra Government College
- Dr. B.R. Ambedkar College
- Dr. K.R. Adhikary College of Optometry & Paramedical Technology
- Dwijendralal College
- Global Institute of Management & Technology
- Haringhata Mahavidyalaya
- J.R.S.E.T. College of Law
- Kaliganj Government College
- Kalyani Mahavidyalaya
- Kalyani Technology Academy
- Karimpur Pannadevi College
- Krishnagar Government College
- Krishnagar Women's College
- Nabadwip Vidyasagar College
- Nakashipara Government College
- Plassey College
- Pritilata Waddedar Mahavidyalaya
- Ranaghat College
- Santipur College
- Snehangshu Kanta Acharya Institute of Law
- Srikrishna College
- Sudhiranjan Lahiri Mahavidyalaya
- Tagore School of Rural Development & Agriculture
- Tehatta Government College
- Kalyani Government Engineering College
- JIS College of Engineering, Kalyani
- Muragacha Government College, Muragachha

=== North 24 Parganas ===
Located within North 24 Parganas:

- Acharya Prafulla Chandra College, New Barrackpore
- Adamas Institute of Technology, Barasat
- Adyapeath Annada Polytechnic College, Adyapeath, Dakshineswar
- Banipur Mahila Mahavidyalaya, Habra
- Basirhat College
- Barrackpore Rastraguru Surendranath College
- Barasat College, Barasat
- Barasat Government College, Barasat
- Bhairab Ganguly College, Belgharia
- Chandraketugarh Sahidullah Smriti Mahavidyalaya, Berachampa
- Dinabandhu Mahavidyalay, Bongaon
- Dr. B.R. Ambedkar Satabarshiki Mahavidyalaya, Bagdah
- Gobardanga Hindu College, Gobardanga
- Hingalganj Mahavidyalay, Hingalganj
- Kanchrapara College, Kanchrapara
- Mahadevananda Mahavidyalaya, Barrackpore
- Morning Star College, Barrackpore
- Naba Barrackpore Prafulla Chandra Mahavidyalaya, New Barrackpore
- Nahata Jogendranath Mandal Smriti Mahavidyalaya, Nahata
- Narula Institute of Technology, Agarpara
- Panihati Mahavidyalaya
- P. R. Thakur Government College, Thakurnagar
- Rishi Bankim Chandra College, Naihati
- Sree Chaitanya College, Habra
- Sree Chaitanya Mahavidyalaya, Habra
- Vivekananda Centenary College, Rahara, Kolkata
- Vivekananda College, Madhyamgram
- Camellia Institute of Technology
- Guru Nanak Institute of Technology

=== Paschim Bardhaman ===
- Banwarilal Bhalotia College, Ushagram Asansol
- Khandra College, Khandra
- Bidhan Chandra College, Burnpur Asansol
- Triveni Devi Bhalotia College, Raniganj, Asansol
- Asansol Polytechnic, South Dhadka, Asansol
- Asansol Engineering College, Asansol
- Asansol Girls' College, Asansol
- Deshbandhu Mahavidyalaya, Chittaranjan, Asansol
- NSHM Knowledge Campus, Durgapur
- Durgapur Government College
- Durgapur Women's College
- Bengal College of Engineering & Technology, Durgapur
- Dr. B.C. Roy Engineering College, Durgapur

=== Pashim Medinipur ===
- Keshiary Government College, Keshiary
- Belda College, Belda
- Midnapore College, Medinipur
- Raja Narendra Lal Khan Women's College, Medinipur
- Kharagpur College, Kharagpur
- Sukumar Sengupta Mahavidyalaya, Keshpur
- Narajole Raj College, Narajole
- Garhbeta College
- Gourav Guin Memorial College, Chandrakona
- Hijli College, Hijli Kharagpur.
- Debra Thana Sahid Kshudiram Smriti Mahavidyalaya, Debra, Paschim Medinipur
- Santal Bidroha Sardha Satabarsiki Mahavidyalaya, Goaltore
- Chandrakona Vidyasagar Mahavidyalaya, Chandrakona
- Institute of Science and Technology, West Bengal, Chandrakona
- Salboni Dream Land, Salboni
- Pingla Thana Mahavidyalaya, Pingla
- Sabang Sajanikanta Mahavidyalaya, Sabang, Paschim Medinipur
- Bhatter College, Dantan
- Midnapore Medical College and Hospital
- Dr B C Roy Institute of Medical Sciences & Research
- Indian Institute of Technology Kharagpur

=== Purba Bardhaman ===
- University Institute of Technology, Burdwan University (UIT)
- Burdwan Medical College, Bardhaman
- Bardhaman Raj College
- Vivekananda Mahavidyalaya, Bardhaman
- M. U. C. Women's College, Bardhaman
- St. Xavier's College, Burdwan
- Burdwan Homoeopathic Medical College & Hospital, Bardhaman
- Burdwan Institute Management and Computer Science, Bardhaman
- Burdwan Institute of Medical and Life Sciences, Bardhaman
- AMEX (an Institute of Professional Studies), Bardhaman
- M.B.C. Institute of Engineering and Technology, Bardhaman
- Debargha Memorial I.T.I., Bardhaman
- Syamsundar College, Bardhaman
- Dr. Bhupendra Nath Dutta Smriti Mahavidyalaya, Bardhaman
- Gushkara Mahavidyalaya, Gushkara
- Cyber Research & Training Institute, Bardhaman
- Dr. Gourmohan Roy College, Monteswar
- Galsi Mahavidyalaya, Galsi, Bardhaman
- Sir Rashbehari Ghosh Mahavidyalaya, Ukhrid, Khandaghosh
- Achaya Sukumar Sen Mahavidyalaya, Gotan
- Memari College, Memari
- Katwa College, Katwa
- Khandra College
- Kalna College, Kalna
- Dr. Gour Mohan Roy College, Monteswar
- Swami Vivekananda Institution for Teachers' Training, Kurmun

=== Purba Medinipur ===
- Prabhat Kumar College, Contai
- Mugberia Gangadhar Mahavidyalaya, Bhagabanpur II, Contai
- Deshapran Mahavidyalaya, Contai
- Ramnagar College, Ramnagar II, Contai
- Khejuri College, Khejuri, Contai
- Egra Sarada Shashi Bhusan College, Egra
- Bajkul Milani Mahavidyalaya, Bhagabanpur I, Egra
- Yogoda Satsanga Palpara Mahavidyalaya, Patashpur, Egra
- Haldia Government College, Haldia
- Mahisadal Raj College, Mahisadal, Haldia
- Mahishadal Girls College, Mahisadal, Haldia
- Sitananda College, Nandigram
- Swarnamoyee Jogendranath Mahavidyalaya, Nandigram
- Vivekananda Mission Mahavidyalaya, Chaitanyapur, Haldia
- Tamralipta Mahavidyalaya, Tamluk
- Tamralipto Government Medical College and Hospital, Tamluk
- Maharaja Nandakumar Mahavidyalaya, Nandakumar
- Moyna College, Moyna, Purba Medinipur
- Rabindra Bharati Mahavidyalaya, Kolaghat
- Shahid Matangini Hazra Government College for Women, Tamluk
- Panskura Banamali College, Panskura
- Siddhinath Mahavidyalaya, Panskura
- Haldia Institute of Technology, Haldia

=== Purulia ===
- Sidho Kanho Birsha University, Purulia
- Purulia Government Engineering College
- J. K. College
- Raghunathpur College
- Manbhum Mahavidyalaya
- Nistarini Women's College
- Achhruram Memorial College, Jhalda
- Balarampur College
- Ananda Marga College
- Ananda Marga Gurukula Teacher's Training College
- Bikramjeet Goswami Memorial College

=== South 24 Parganas ===
- Baruipur College
- L.J.D. College, Falta
- Magrahat College
- Budge Budge College
- Maheshtala College
- Fakir Chand College
- Sundarban Mahavidyalaya
- Shirakole Mahavidyalaya
- Dhruba Chand Halder College
- Gourmohan Sachin Mondal Mahavidyalaya
- Sushil Kar College
- Jibantala Rokeya Mahavidyalaya
- Raidighi College
- Sukanta College
- Bankim Sardar College

=== Uttar Dinajpur ===
- Dr. Meghnath Saha College
- Islampur College
- Kaliyaganj College
- Raiganj Surendranath Mahavidyalaya
- Shree Agrasen Mahavidyalaya, Dalkhola
- Raiganj University
- Durgapur Women's College
- Chopra Kamala Paul Smriti Mahavidyalaya, Chopra

== Gallery ==
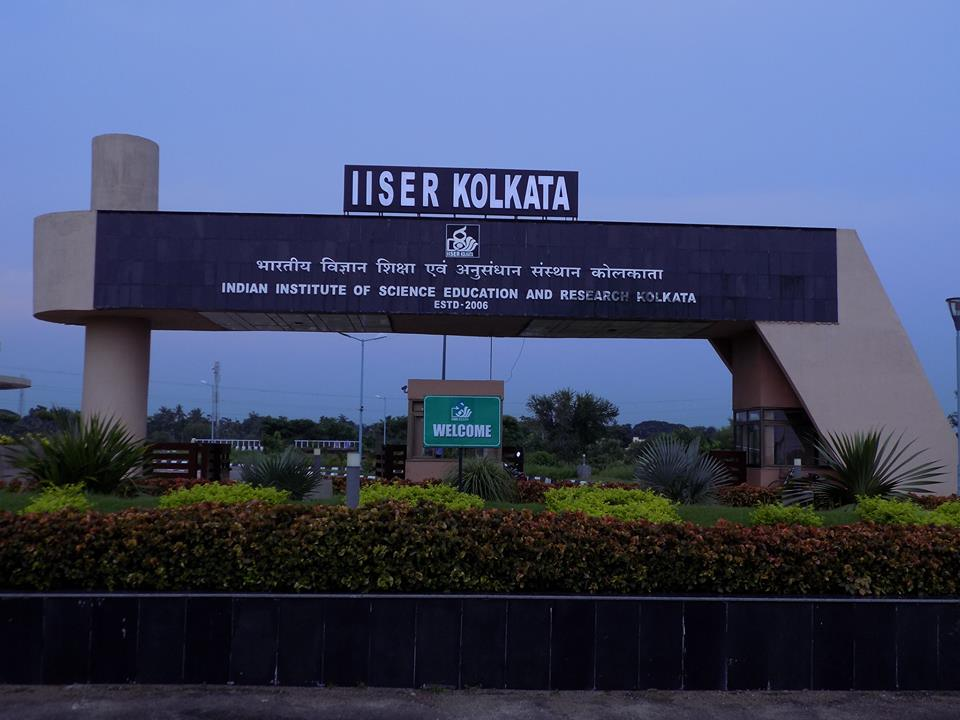
IISER Kolkata Main Entrance gate

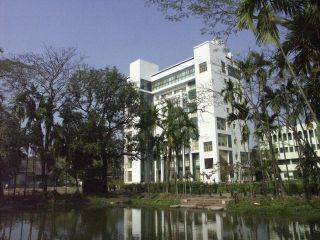
New Academic Building, ISI Kolkata

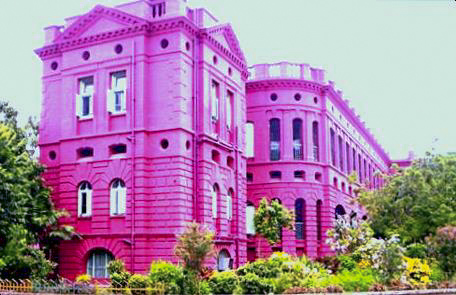
Institute of Post-Graduate Medical Education and Research, Kolkata is the largest hospital in West Bengal and one of the oldest in Kolkata.

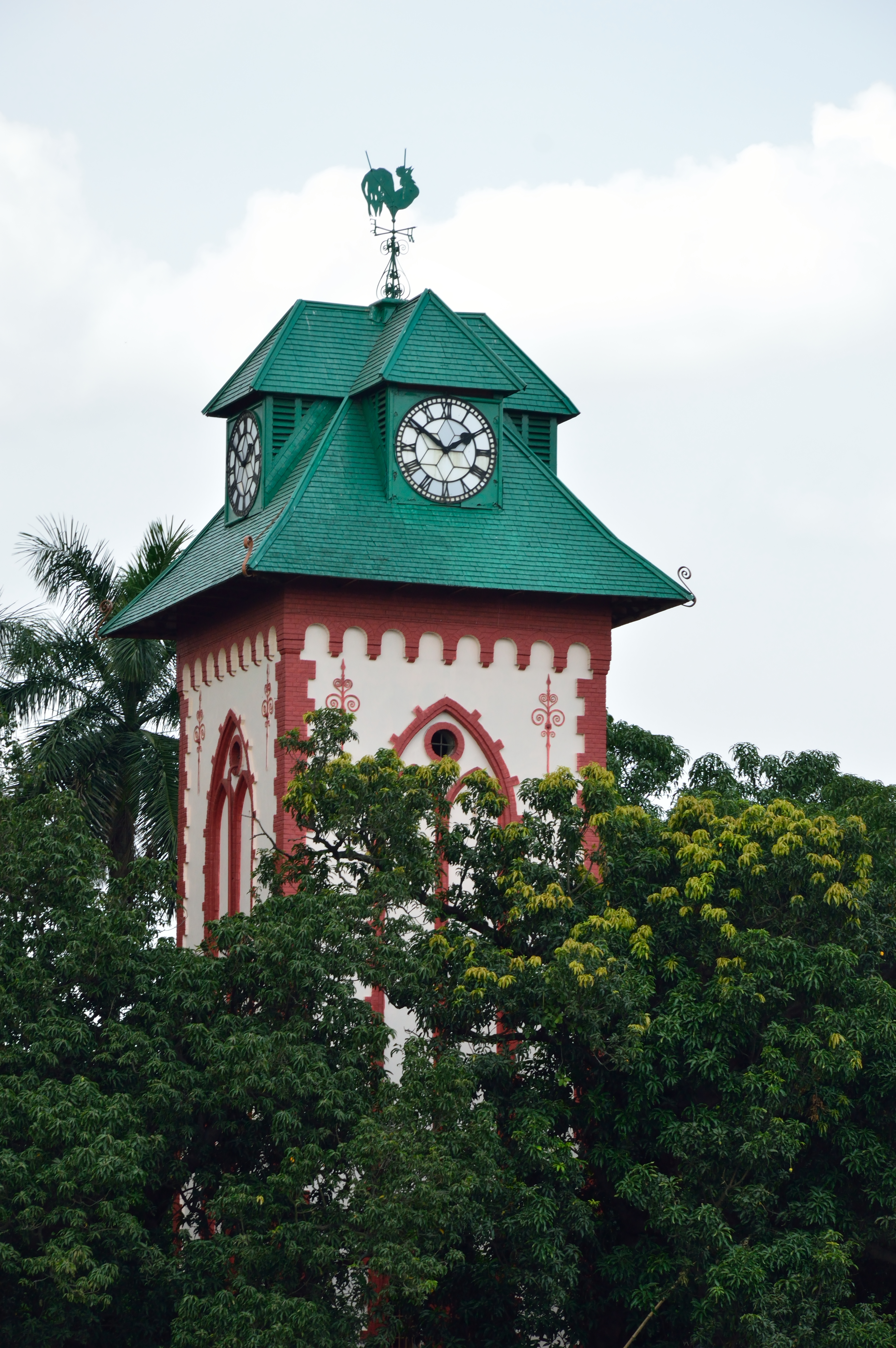
The Clock Tower, IIEST, Shibpur

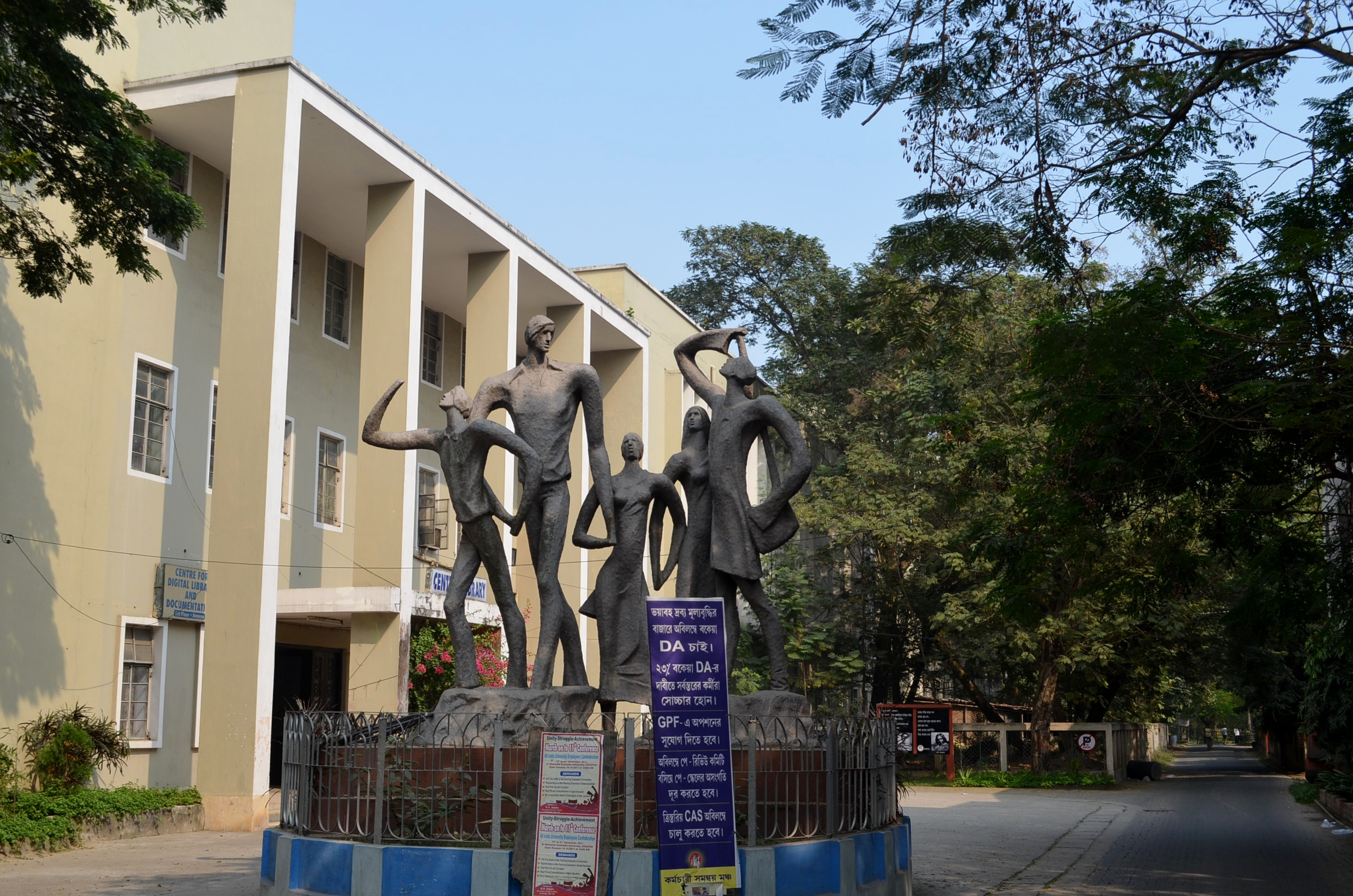
Jadavpur University Central Library

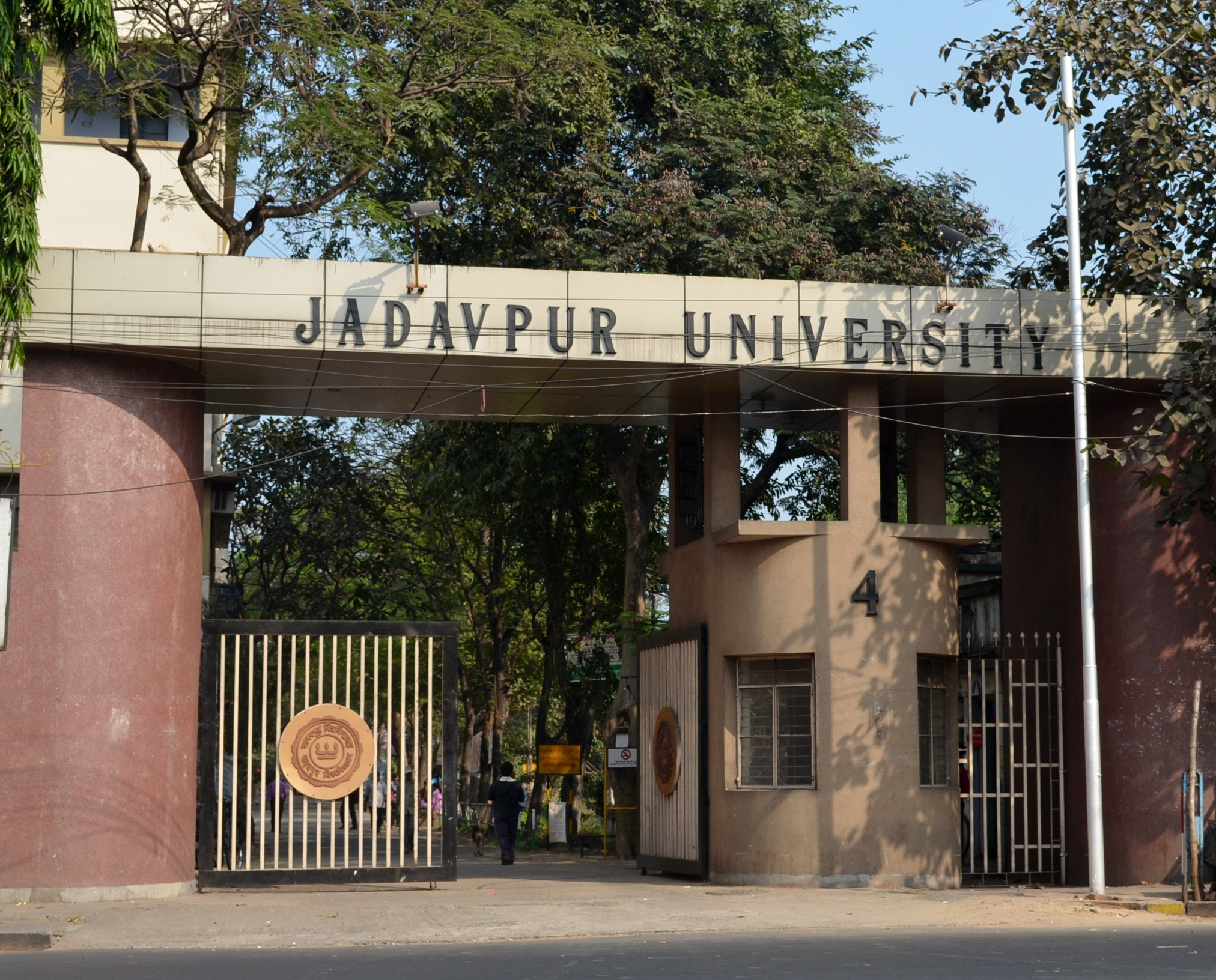
Jadavpur University Gate No. 4

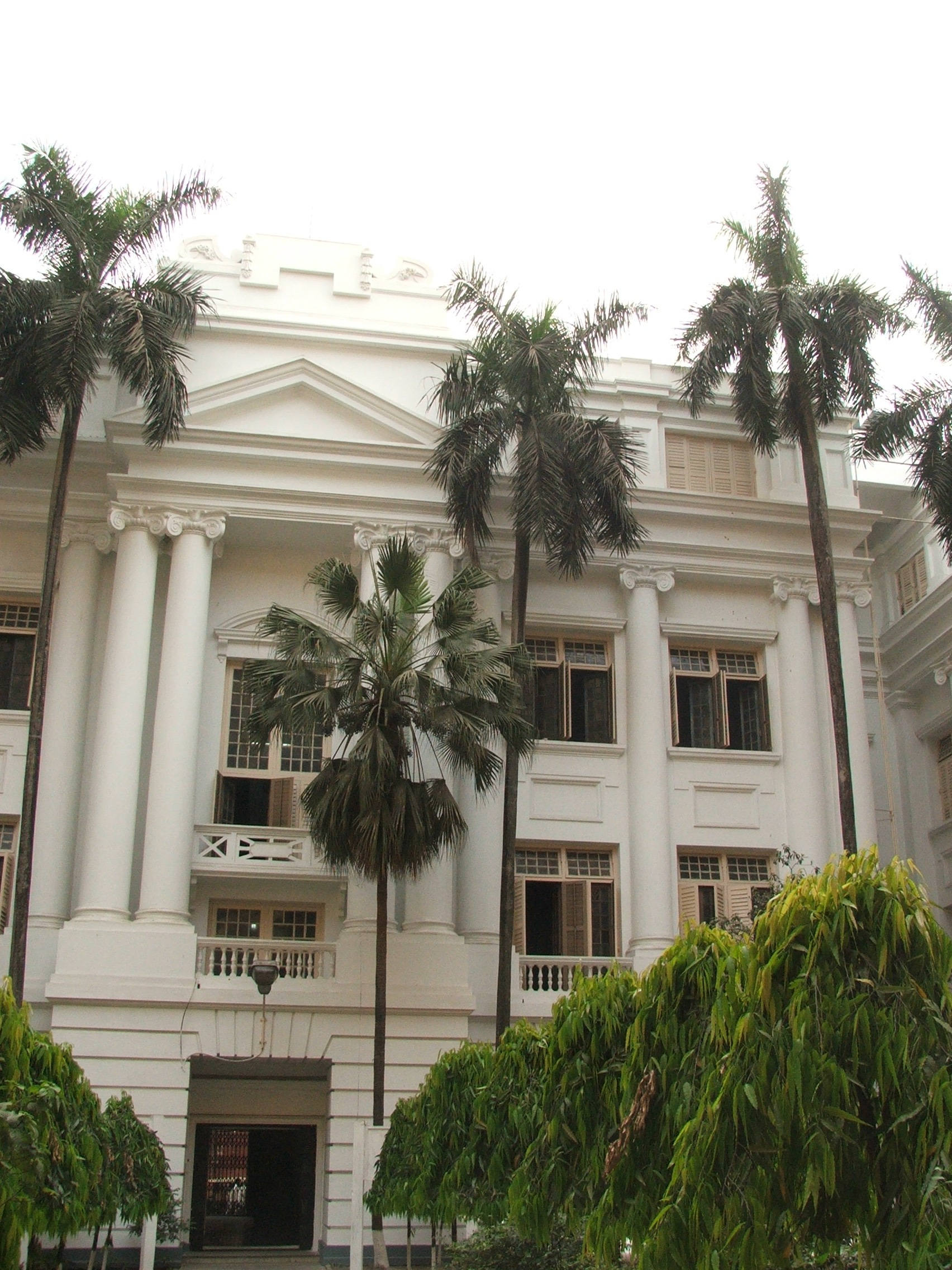
University of Calcutta Main Campus

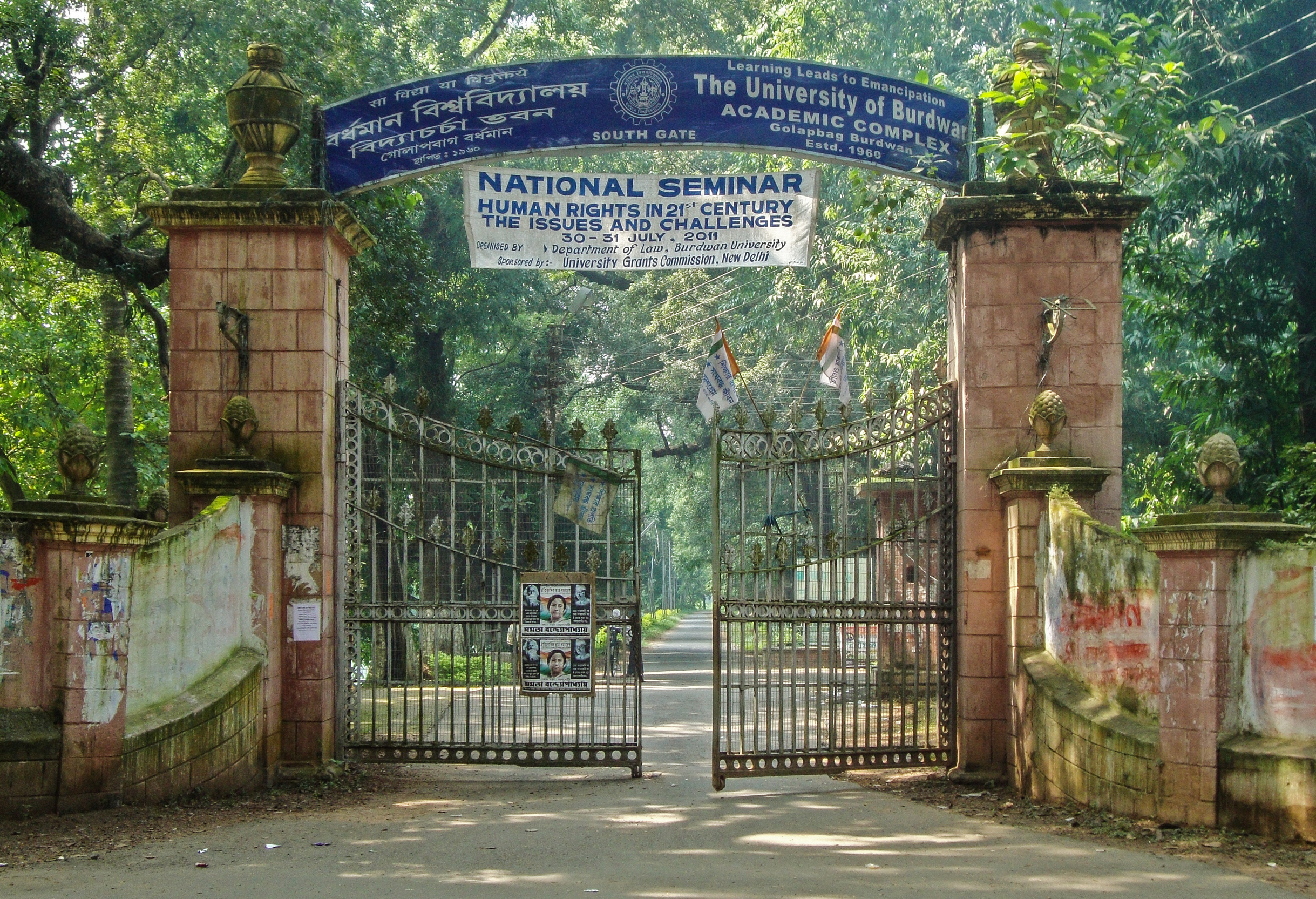
Burdwan University academic complex, South Gate

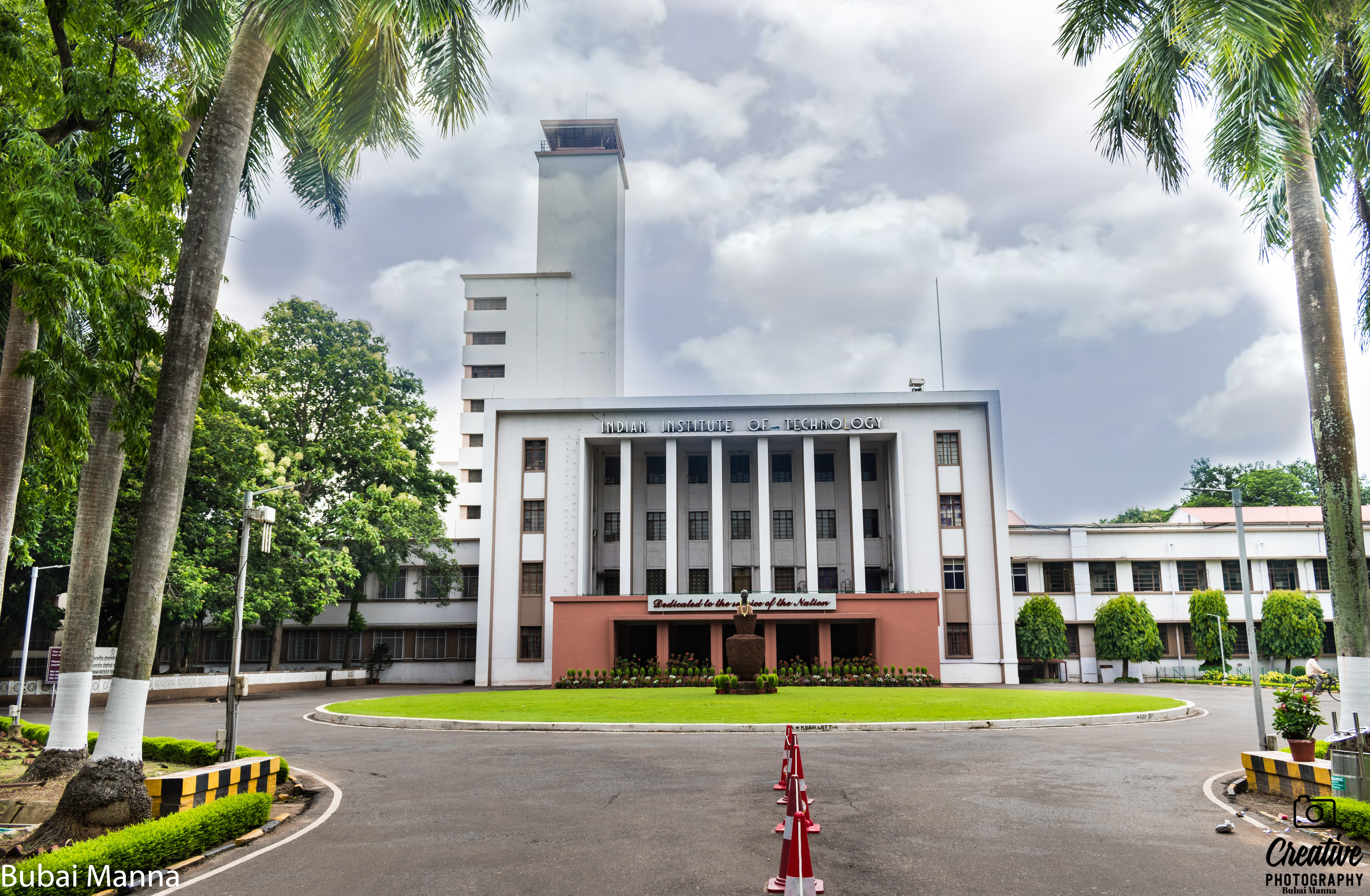
IIT Kharagpur main building

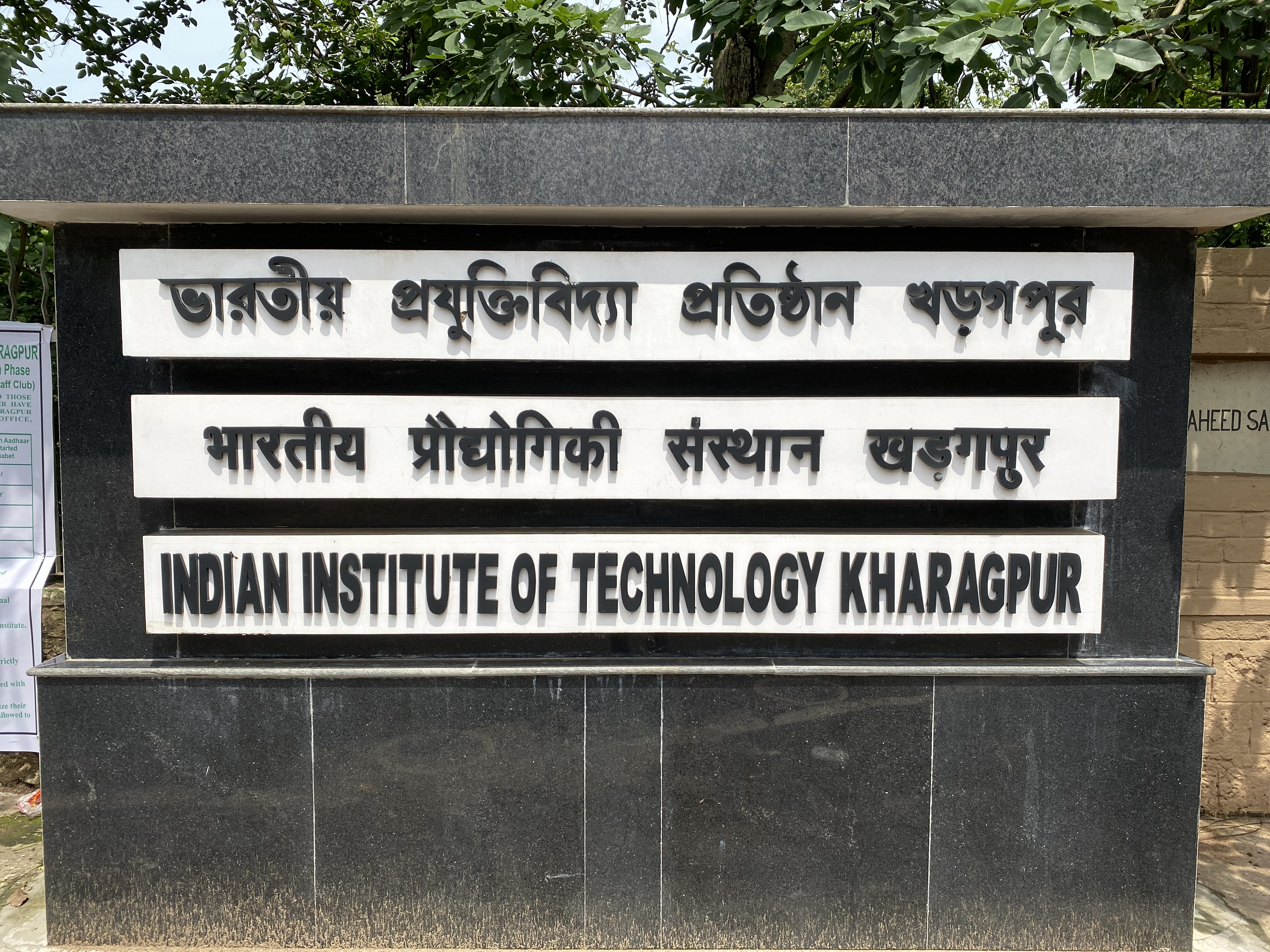
Trilingual nameplate at the main entrance of Indian Institute of Technology, Kharagpur

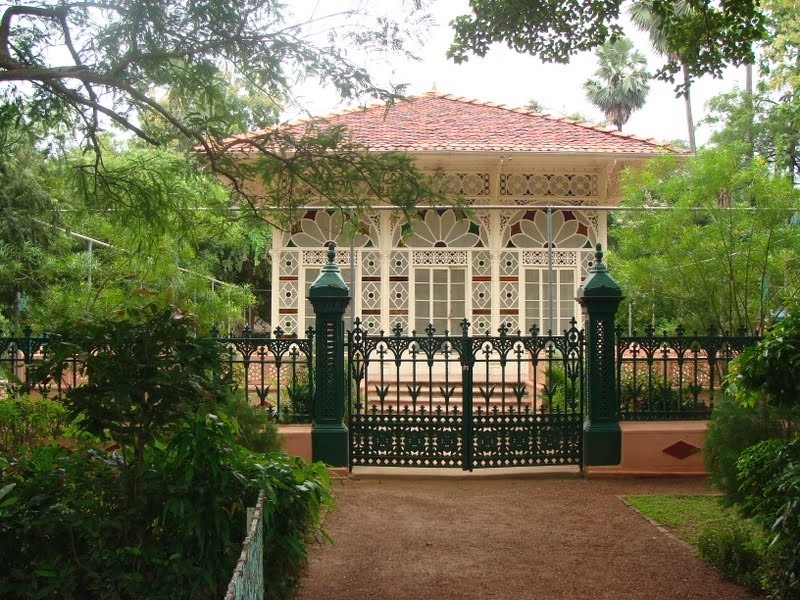
Upasana Griha, Visva-Bharati University, Santiniketan

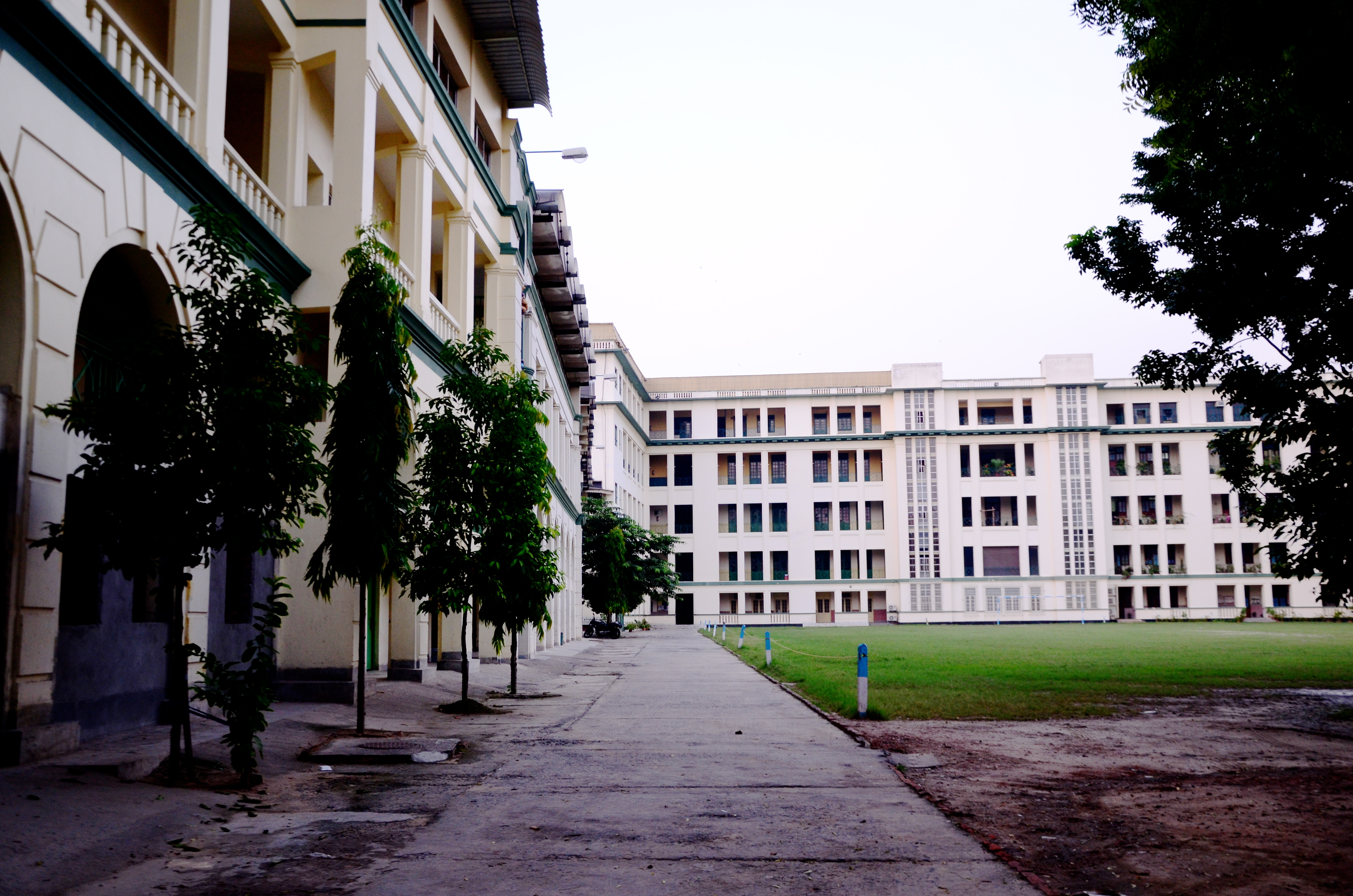
St. Xavier's College

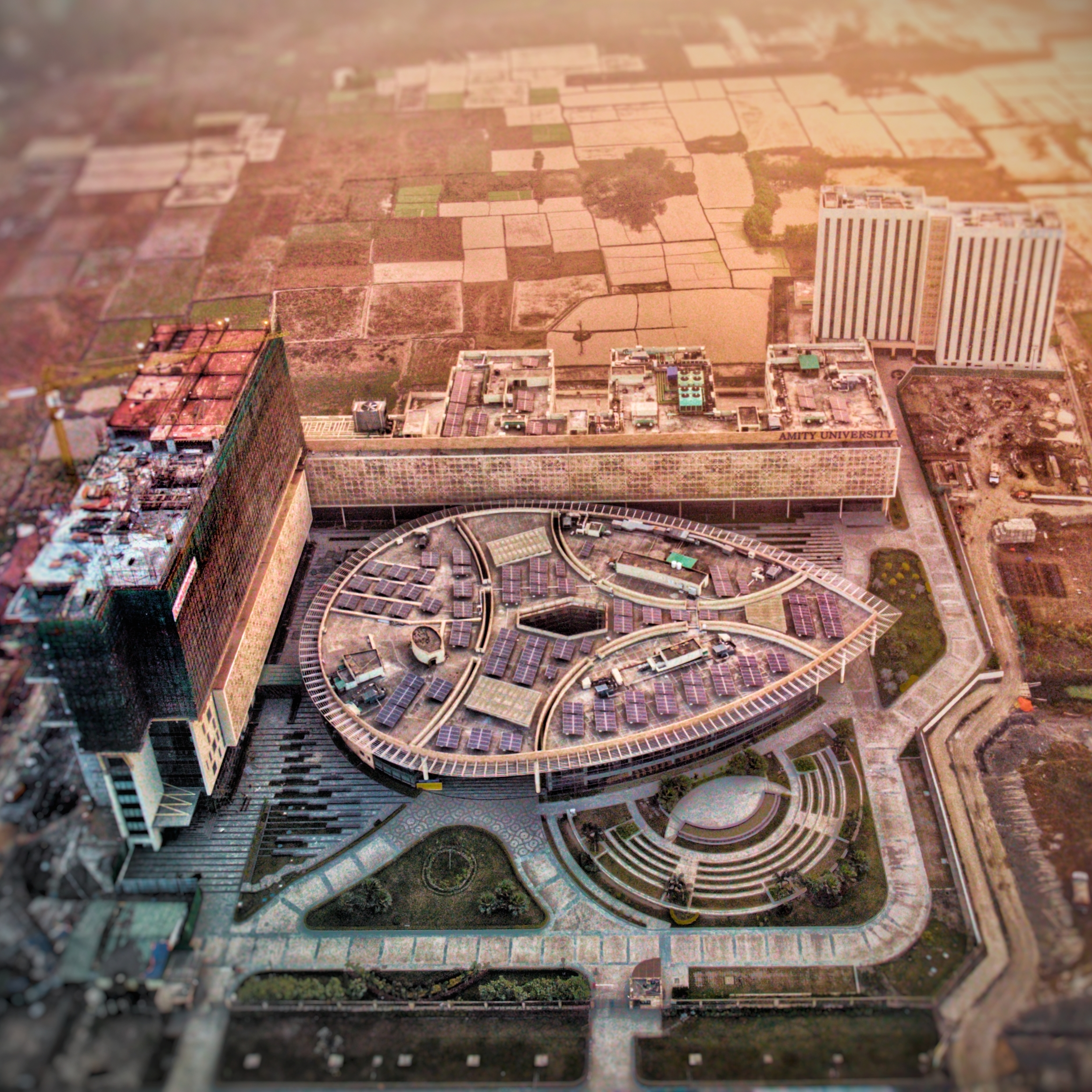
Amity University, Kolkata

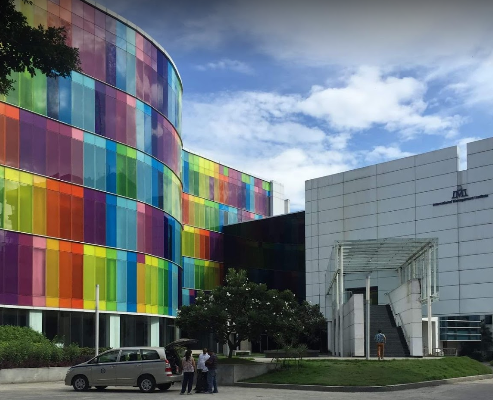
IMI Kolkata view

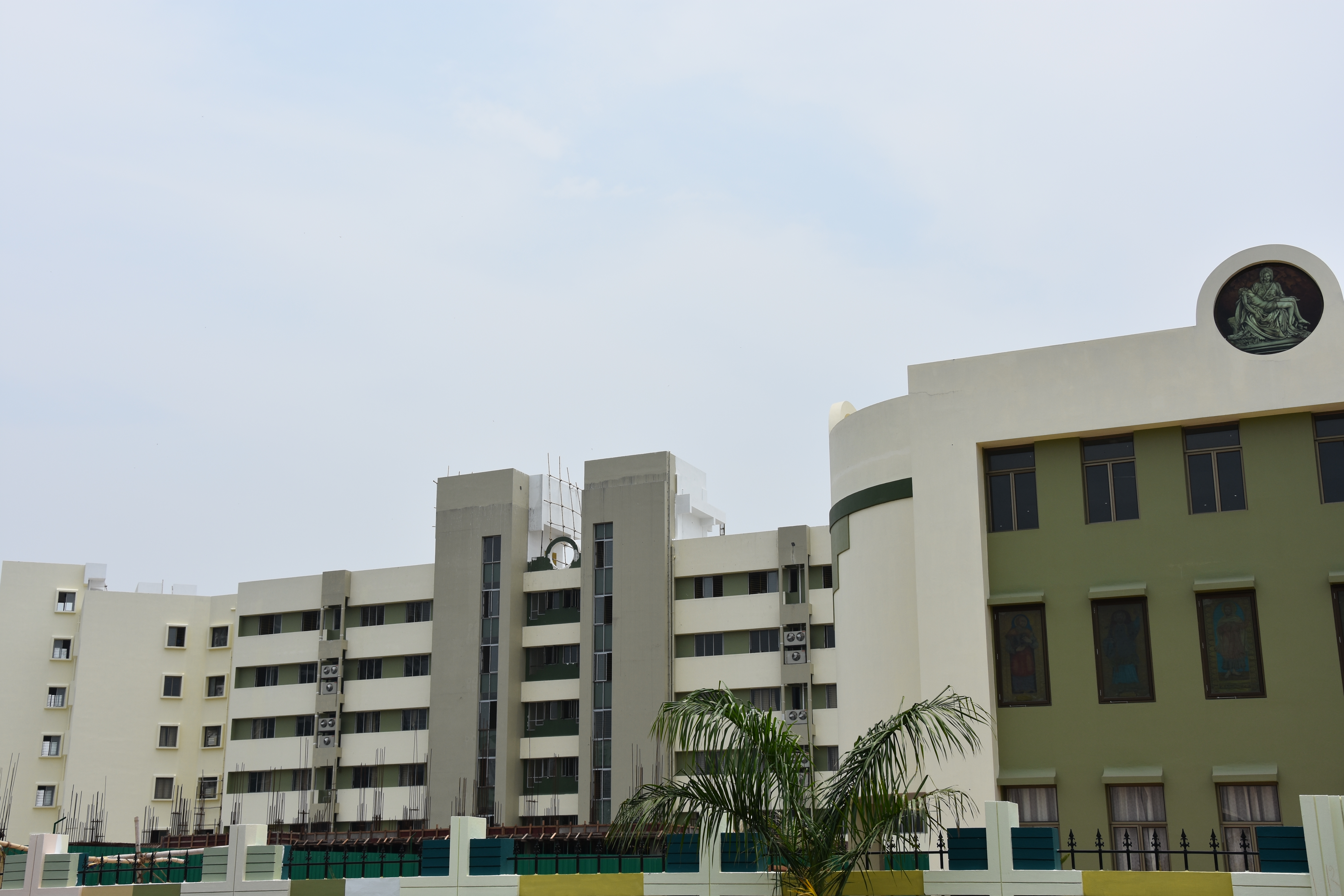
St. Xavier's University, Kolkata

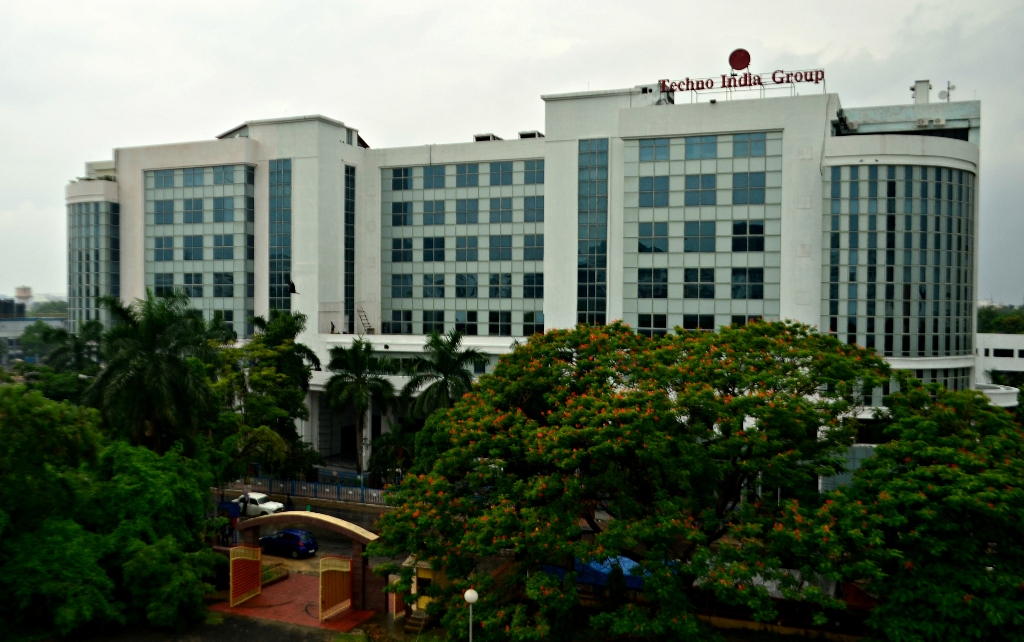
Techno India University

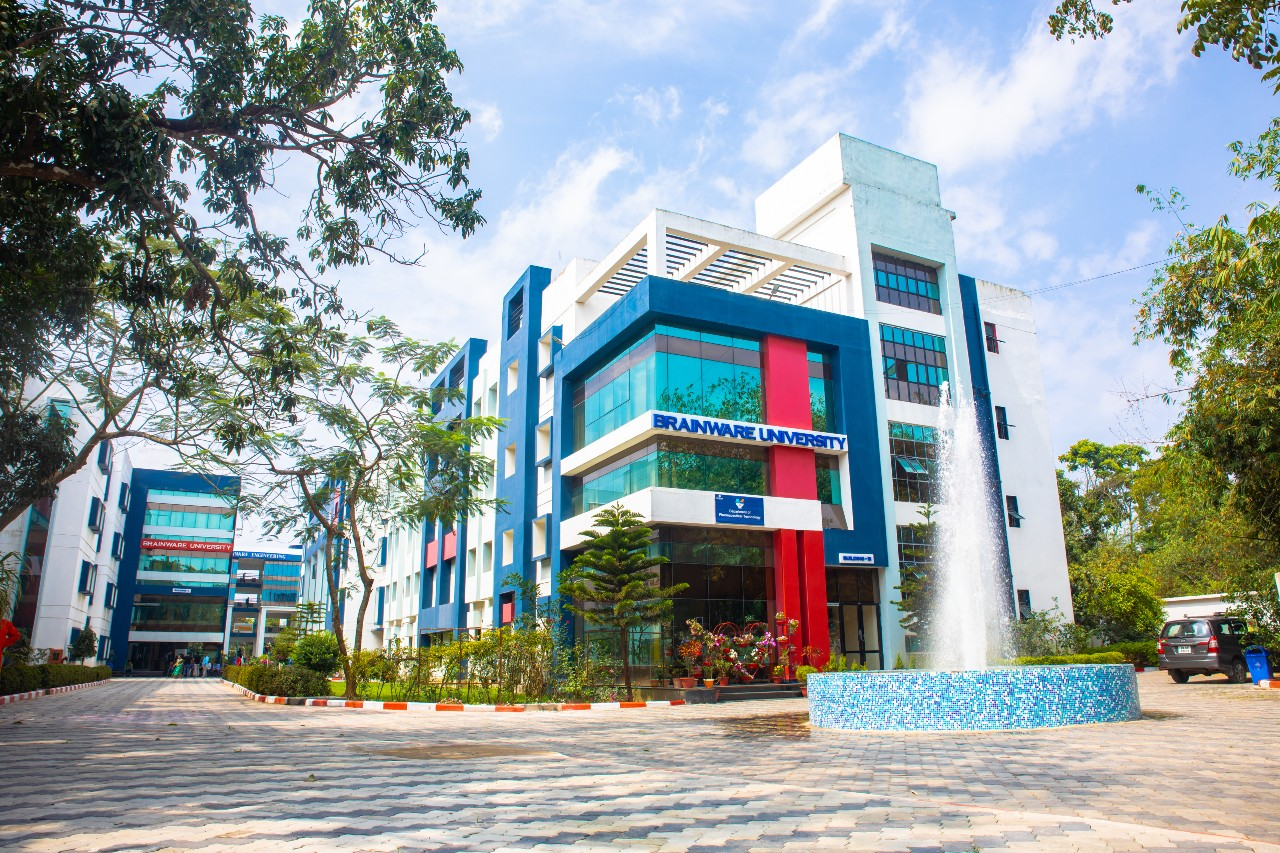
Brainware University

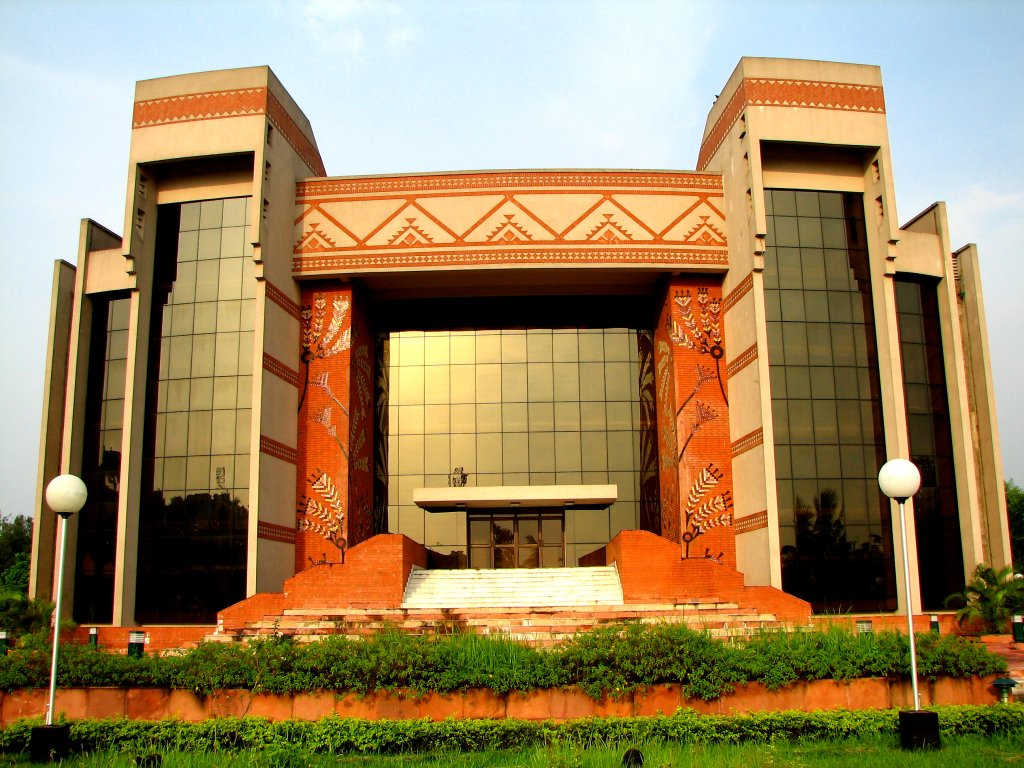
IIM Calcutta Auditorium

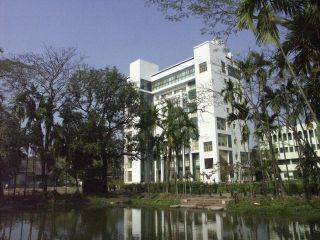
Academic Building, ISI Kolkata

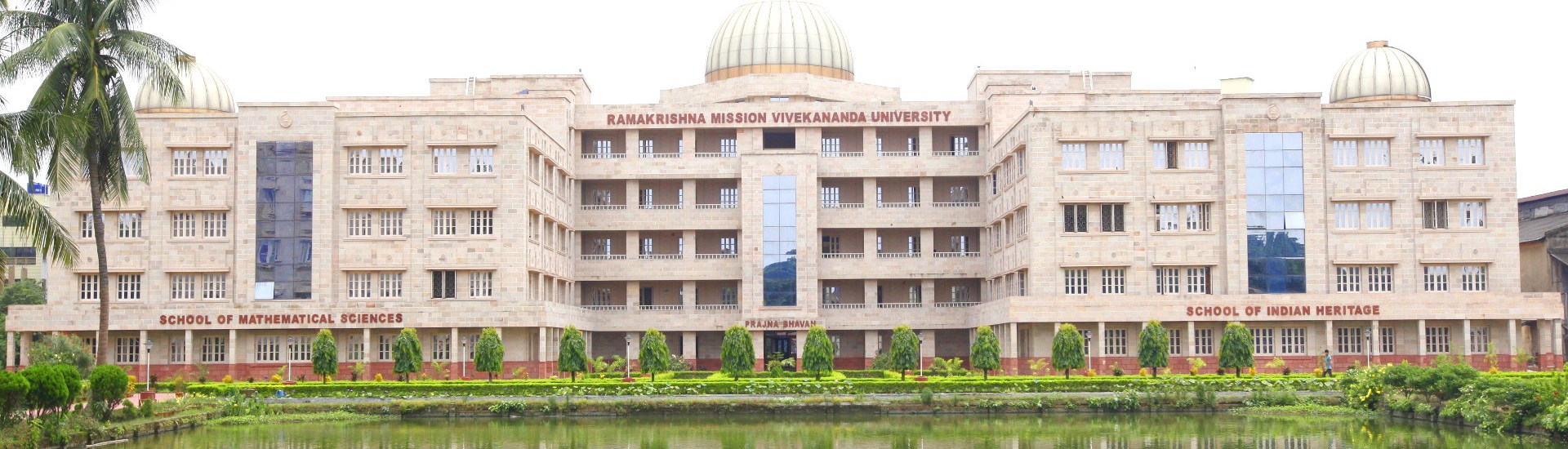
RKMVERI Prajna Bhavan

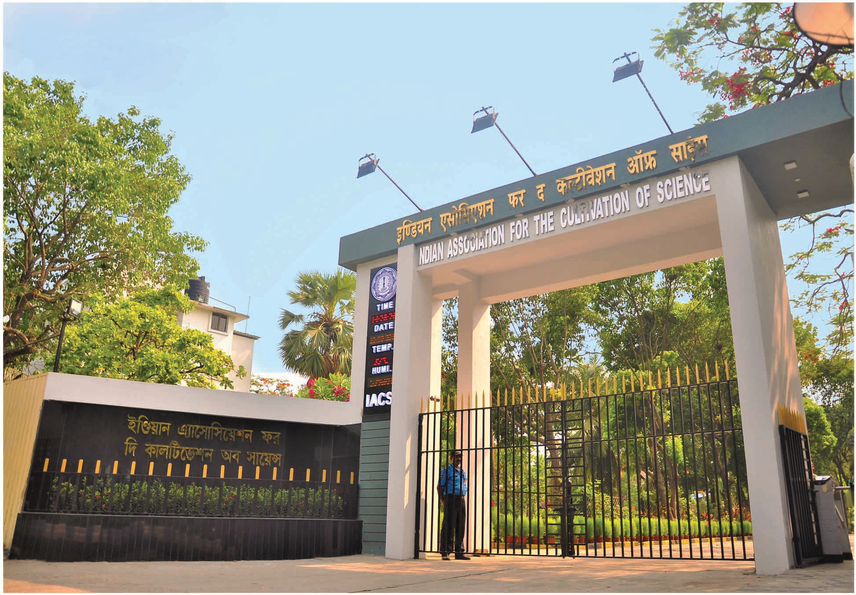
Indian Association for the Cultivation of Science

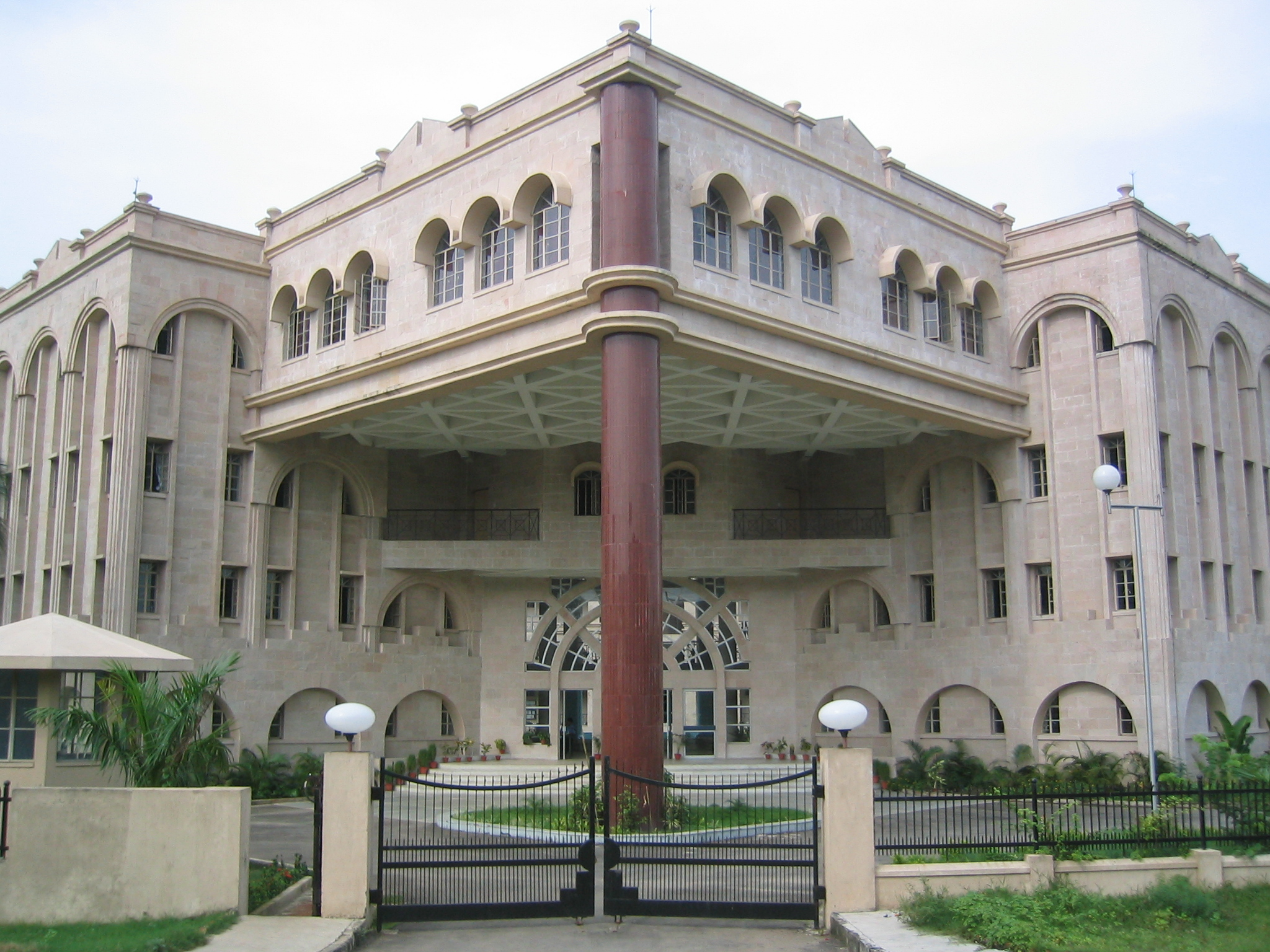
WBNUJS, Kolkata

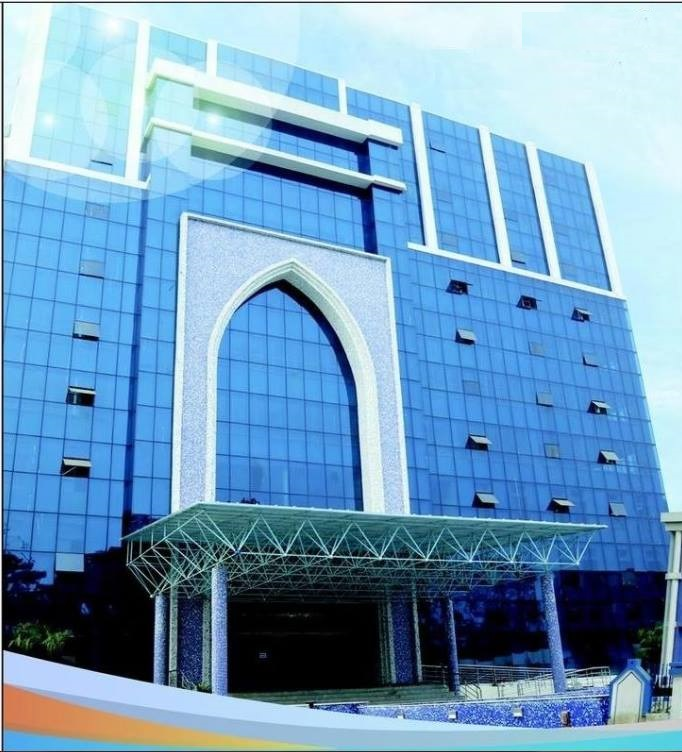
Aliah University City Campus, Park Circus

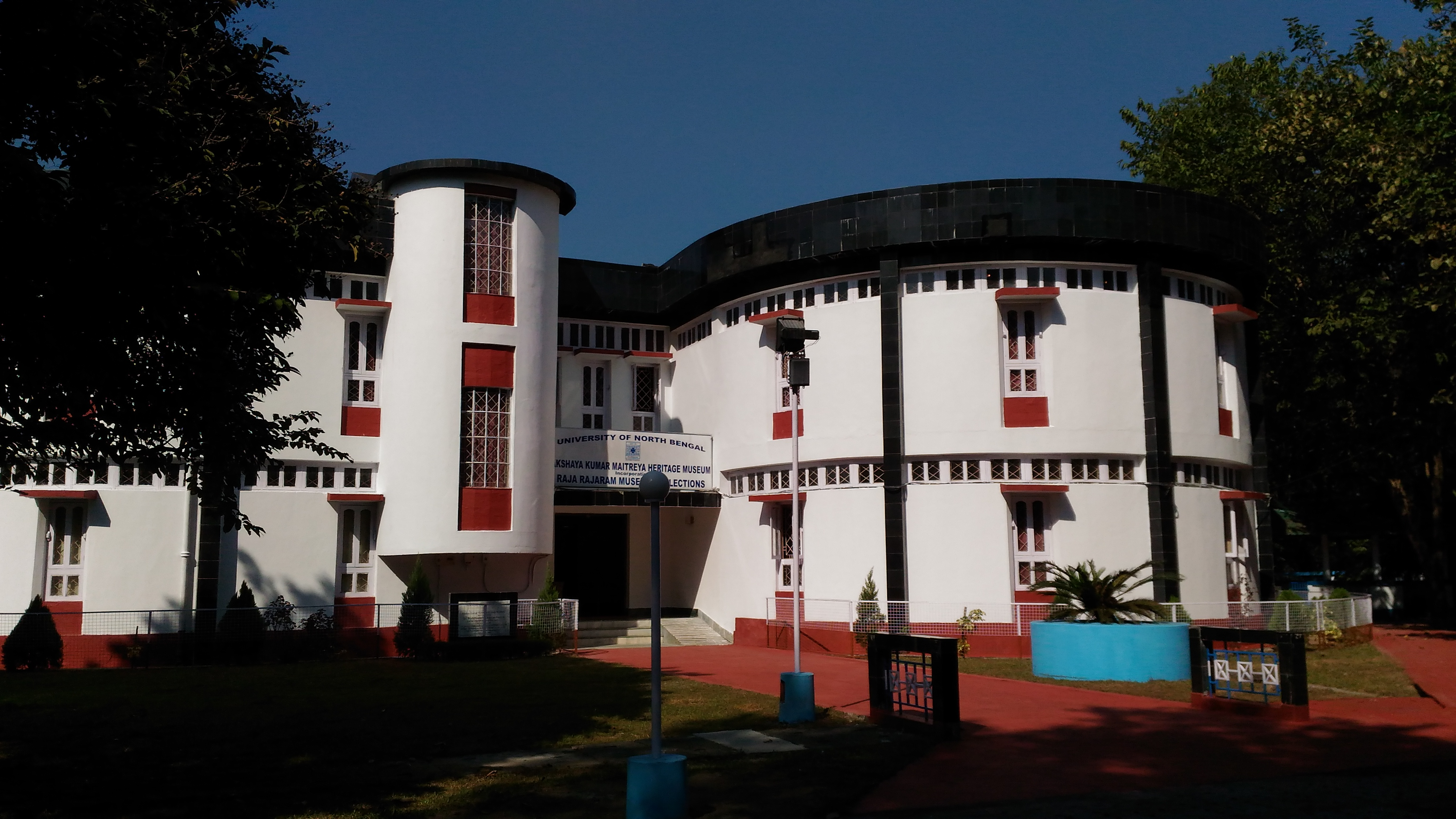
North Bengal University Museum

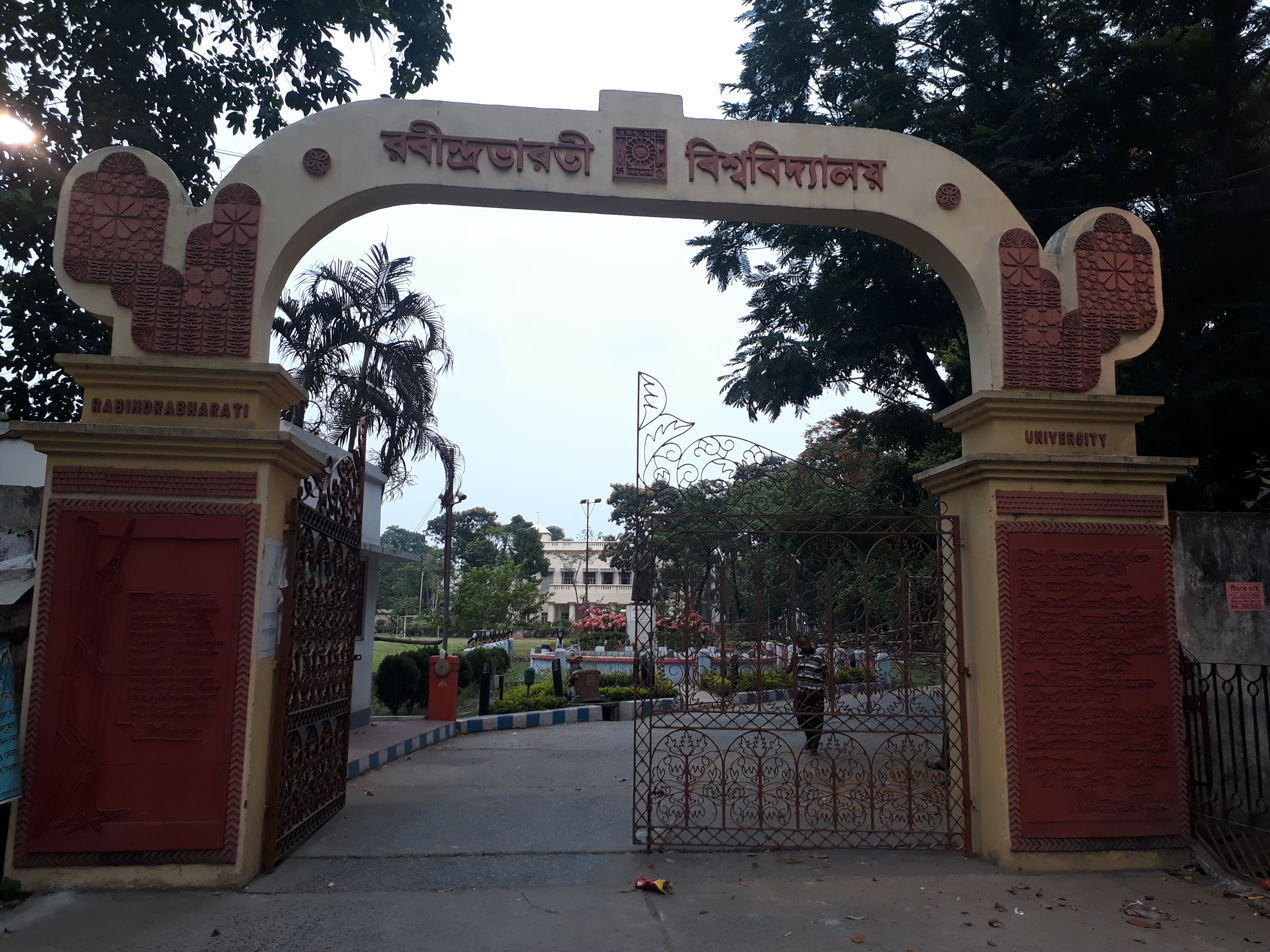
Rabindra Bharati University

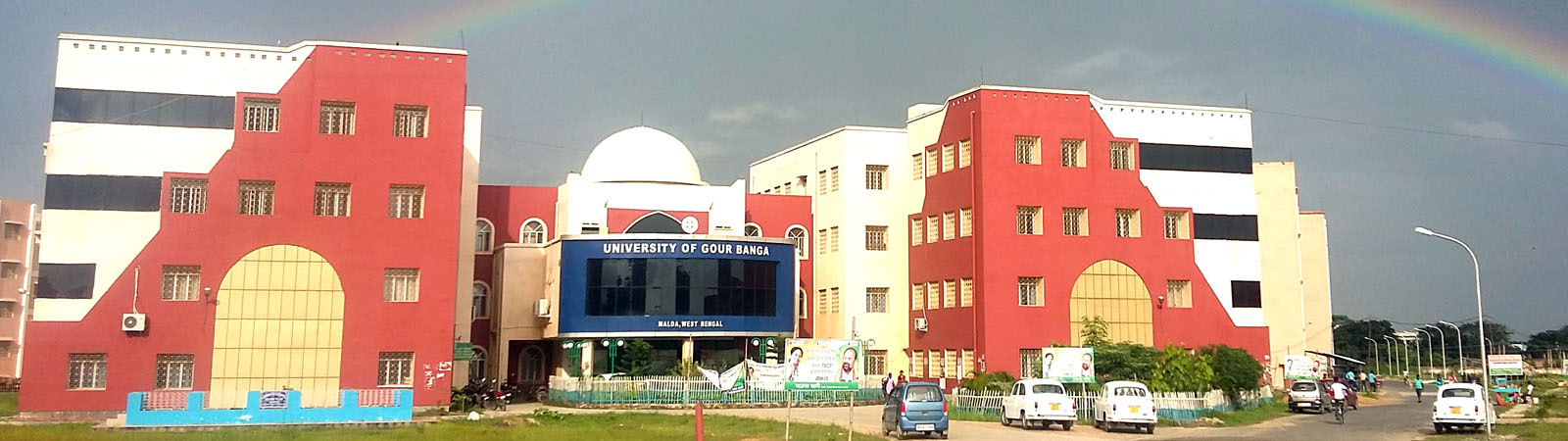
University of Gour Banga

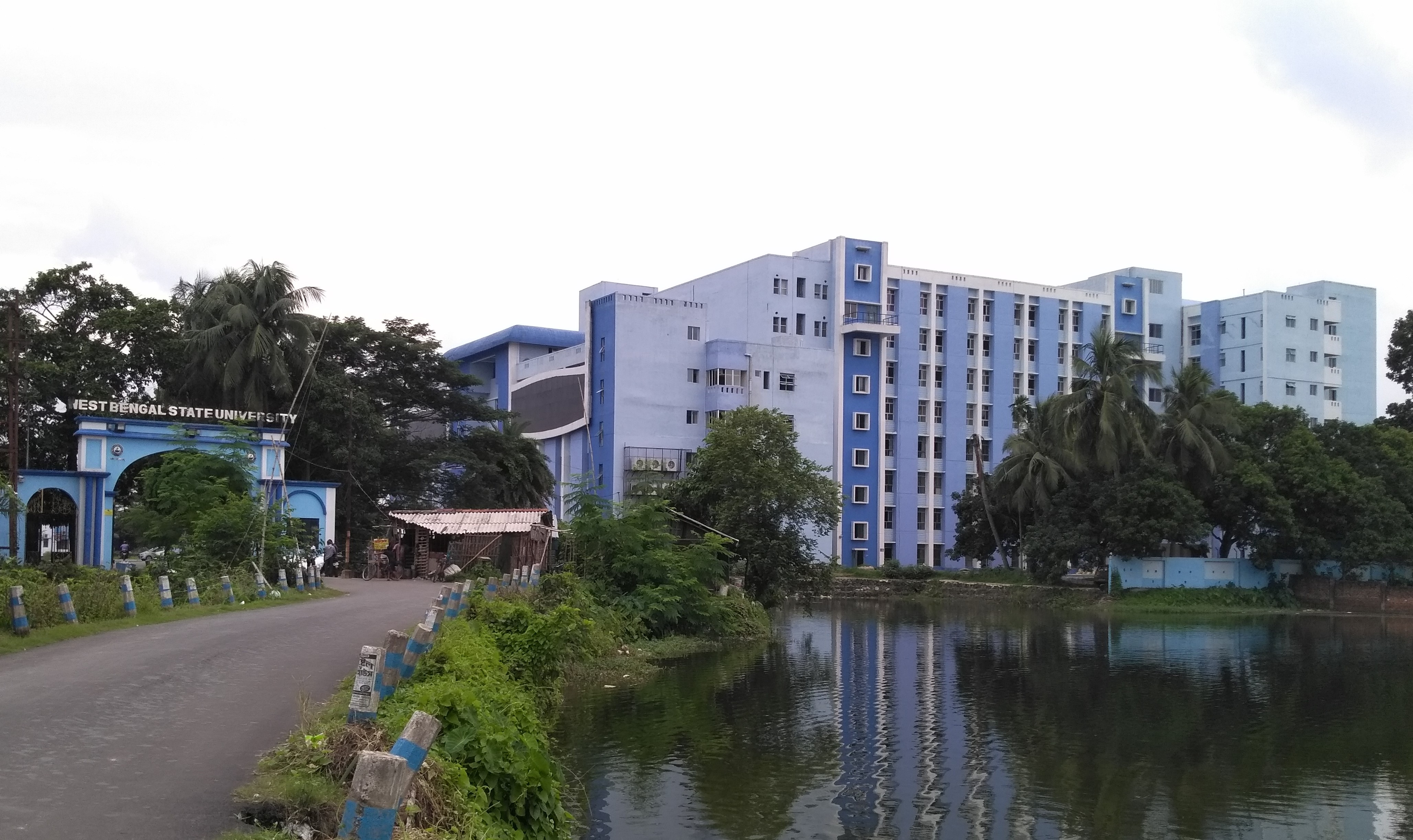
West Bengal State University
