= Bengal Institute of Technology, Kolkata =

College in West Bengal

Techno Bengal Institute of Technology
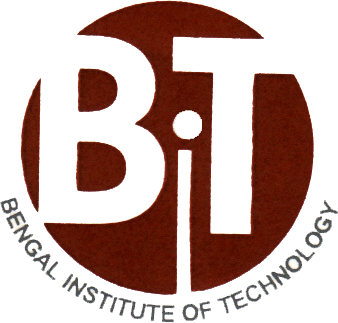
- Type: Private Engineering College
- Established: 2000; 26 years ago
- Affiliations: Maulana Abul Kalam Azad University of Technology
- Principal: Dr. Narayan C.Ghosh
- Students: 850–900
- Location: No. 1, Basanti Hwy, Brahmapur Government Colony, Bagdoba, Kolkata, West Bengal, 700150, India; 22.521596°N 88.459828°E
- Campus: Suburban
- Website: bitcollege.in
- Location within West Bengal Location within India

Techno Bengal Institute of Technology (formerly known as Bengal Institute of Technology or BIT) is a private engineering college located in Kolkata, West Bengal, India. The college was established in the year 2000 with four AICTE approved Courses. It is a part of Techno India Group. The institute is approved by All India Council of Technical Education (AICTE) and affiliated to Maulana Abul Kalam Azad University of Technology (formerly WBUT).

== Campus ==
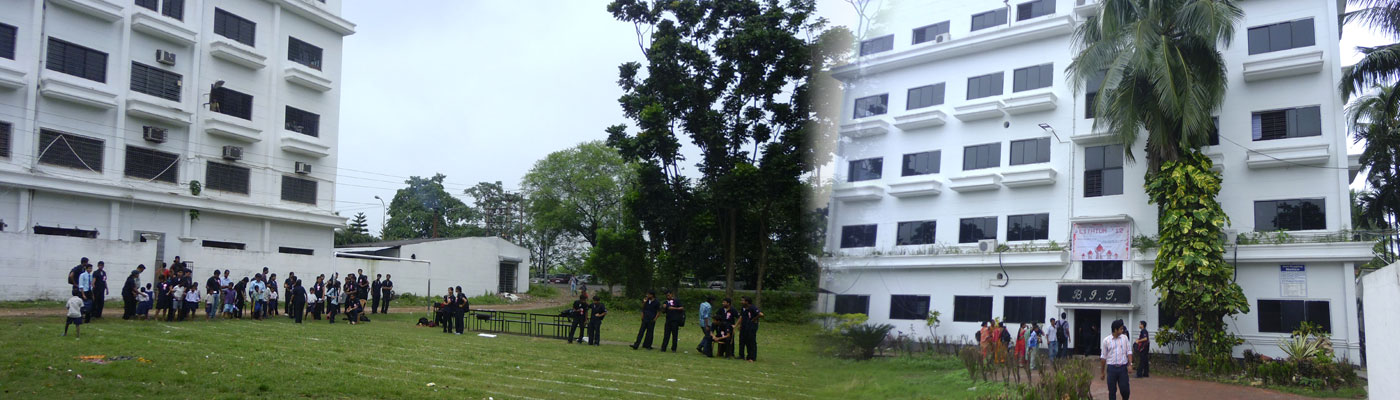
BIT Main building

The college has two campuses, one for Biotechnology Department and the other (aka BIT Main Building) for the remaining departments. Both buildings are entirely covered by Wi-Fi facility. The library has a total collection of 34612 books of almost 3436 titles covering a vast number of subjects. There is a student activity center for co-curricular and extracurricular activities.

== Ranking ==
Techno Bengal Institute of Technology (NAAC accredited B++)ranked 5th in West Bengal, 91st in India among all Engineering Institutes by NIRF, Dept. of Higher Education, MHRD, Govt. of India in 2016. In 2018, it was in the rank band 151 to 200 and in 2020, it has been ranked in the rank band 251 to 300 by NIRF, Dept. of Higher Education, MHRD, Govt. of India. TechnoBIT has also been ranked 51st according to the digital LEARNING National Engineering Ranking 2020.

== See also ==
- List of institutions of higher education in West Bengal
- Education in India
- Education in West Bengal
