= Tarakeswar Degree College =

- Motto: From Quality Awareness To Quality Assurance To Quality Sustenance
- Type: Undergraduate college Public college
- Established: 1986; 40 years ago
- Affiliations: University of Burdwan
- President: Dr. Sujit Roy
- Principal: Dr. Amal Kanta Hati
- Location: Tarakeswar, West Bengal, 712410, India; 22.8822586°N 88.0046473°E
- Campus: Urban
- Website: Tarakeswar Degree College
- Location in West Bengal Tarakeswar Degree College (India)

Tarakeswar Degree College, established in 1986, is an undergraduate general and honours degree college in Tarakeswar in Hooghly district. It offers undergraduate courses in arts, commerce and sciences. It is affiliated to the University of Burdwan.

== History ==
Sri Srimat Dandiswami Hrishikesh Ashram Mahanta Maharaj of Tarakeswar Math donated 3.5 acres of land for the purpose of establishing the college campus. Support from Member of Parliament Sri Anil Basu and Minister of West Bengal Fire & Emergency Services Department Sri Pratim Chatterjee, Sri Shankar Ray Chowdhury, Ex-General of Army & Member of Rajya Sabha, who made contributions from their Local area development funds became instrumental in shaping the college.

== Departments ==
=== Science ===
- Physics
- Mathematics
- Computer Science
- Chemistry

Arts and Commerce

- Bengali
- English
- History
- Sanskrit
- Geography
- Philosophy
- Political Science
- Music
- Sociology
- Education
- Physical Education
- Business Administration
- Accountancy
- Economics
- Auditing

== Accreditation ==
Recently, Tarakeswar Degree College has been awarded a B grade by the National Assessment and Accreditation Council. The college is also recognized by the University Grants Commission. In November 2016, a new NAAC accreditation score of 2.43 points (B grade) was awarded.

== See also ==
- List of institutions of higher education in West Bengal
- Education in India
- Education in West Bengal
