= Memari College =

College in West Bengal

Memari College Memaricollege.jpg
- Type: Undergraduate college Public college
- Established: 1981; 45 years ago
- Affiliations: University of Burdwan
- Principal: Dr. Jayati Bhattacharya
- Location: Memari, West Bengal, 713146, India; 23.1655739°N 88.1017722°E
- Campus: Urban
- Language: Bengali
- Website: Memari College
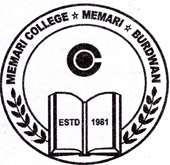

- Location within West Bengal Location within India

Memari College, established in 1981, is the general degree college in Memari, Purba Bardhaman district. It offers undergraduate courses in arts, commerce and sciences. It is affiliated to the University of Burdwan.it is a four story building located in hatpukur GT road memari. the Science Department is extended from the rest of the departments.

== Departments ==
=== Science ===
- Mathematics
- Computer Science
- Physics
- Chemistry
- Botany
- Nutrition
- Economics

=== Arts and Commerce ===
- Journalism and Mass Communication
- Geography
- English
- Bengali
- History
- Sanskrit
- Political Science
- Education
- Philosophy
- Economics
- Commerce
- Music

== Accreditation ==
Recently, Memari College has been re-accredited and awarded B grade by the National Assessment and Accreditation Council (NAAC). The college is also recognized by the University Grants Commission (UGC).

== See also ==
- List of institutions of higher education in West Bengal
- Education in India
- Education in West Bengal
