= Hooghly Women's College =

Women College in West Bengal

Coordinates: 22.9004°N 88.3972°E

- Building at Women's College
- Type: Public
- Established: 1949; 77 years ago
- Affiliations: University of Burdwan
- President: Subir Nag
- Principal: Dr. Sumita Bajpai
- Location: 1, Vivekananda Road, Pipulpati, Chinsurah, West Bengal, 712103, India
- Campus: Urban
- Recognition: NAAC, UGC
- Website: Hooghly Women's College
- Location within West Bengal Location within India

Hooghly Women's College, established in 1949, is a women's arts and sciences college located in the Hooghly district of West Bengal, India. It offers undergraduate courses in arts, commerce and sciences. It is affiliated to the University of Burdwan. Hooghly Women's College is the sixth academic institution in the district and is the first women's college of the district and also is the largest Women's College of Burdwan University.

The college was affiliated to the Calcutta University up to 1962 and then to the University of Burdwan for the degree students in arts and sciences.

== History ==
The initial effort to found a women's college in Hoog. Some local educationists and social reformists made an active endeavor to set up Hooghly Women's College to cater education for women. Sri Nripendranath Dhar, a renowned advocate and educationist was the pioneer in this field. Other figures, inspired by the some missionary zeal joined them. Hooghly Women's College thus started pulsating in the little concrete structure named Mission House” with only 17 students in Chinsurah Maidan in the banks of River Ganga in a day in the year 1943. Unfortunately if came to an abrupt halt as university recognition did not come in time.

After the Independence of India, in 1948, the Government of West Bengal adopted policies and programs to spread women's education. Thus under the benevolent effort of Bengal Mission, a wing of Scotland Church, classes of first year started on 1 August 1949, with only 41 students and four teachers in the tiny building of "Mission House". In February 1952, the Chief Minister Bidhan Chandra Roy inaugurated the new buildings. The first principal to grace the chair of Hooghly Women's College was Sri Kalipada Mitra.

== Departments ==
=== Science ===
- Chemistry
- Physics
- Mathematics
- Microbiology

=== Arts ===
- Bengali
- English
- Sanskrit
- History
- Geography
- Political Science
- Philosophy
- Economics

== Principals of the institution ==
- Sri Kalipada Mitra
- Smt. Santisudha Ghosh, Founder Principal (1951–1970)
- Sm. Sandhyasashi Mukherjee (1970–1980)
- Sm. Anita De (1980–2000)
- Dr. Sumita Bajpai (Since 2000)

== Accreditation ==
Recently, Hooghly Women's College has been awarded B++ grade by the National Assessment and Accreditation Council (NAAC). The college is also recognized by the University Grants Commission (UGC).

== See also ==
- List of institutions of higher education in West Bengal
- Education in India
- Education in West Bengal
