= Kalna College =

College in Kalna, India

- Kalna College
- Motto: Sanskrit: ज्ञनात परतरं न हि
- Type: Undergraduate college Public college
- Established: 1943; 83 years ago
- Founders: Tarapada Thakur
- Affiliations: University of Burdwan
- President: Sri Biswajit Kundu
- Principal: Dr. Tapas Samanta
- Undergraduates: B.A.; B.Sc.; B.Com.
- Postgraduates: M.A; B.Ed
- Location: Near Old Bus Stand, Kalna, West Bengal, 713409, India; 23°13′14″N 88°21′24″E
- Campus: Urban
- Colors: Sky Blue White
- Website: Kalna College
- Location in West Bengal Kalna College (India)

Kalna College, established in 1943, is a college in Kalna, Purba Bardhaman district, West Bengal, India. It offers undergraduate courses in arts, commerce, and sciences. It is affiliated to the University of Burdwan.

== About the College ==
Kalna College was established in 1943, and has gloriously completed its seventy fifth-year in 2018 with new glory, hope, promise and prosperity for years to come. The College is situated one kilometer away from its nearest railway station, Ambika Kalna. The Holy Ganga is also one kilometer away north wards from this college.

== Department ==
- Bengali
- English
- Physics
- Chemistry
- Mathematics
- Computer Science
- Geography
- Botany
- Zoology
- Economics
- History
- Political Science
- Philosophy
- Economics
- Education
- Sanskrit
- Sociology
- Santhali
- Environmental Science

== Accreditation ==
In 2023, Kalna College was re-accredited and awarded A grade by the National Assessment and Accreditation Council (NAAC). The college is recognized by the University Grants Commission (UGC).

== Notable alumni ==
- Ashim Kumar Majhi (born 1963), Indian politician

== See also ==
- List of institutions of higher education in West Bengal
- Education in India
- Education in West Bengal
