= Rani Rashmoni Green University =

University in West Bengal, India

- রাণী রাসমণি সবুজ বিশ্ববিদ্যালয়
- Motto: sā vidyā yā vimuktaye
- Motto in English: That is education which liberates
- Type: Public
- Established: 2018; 8 years ago
- Affiliations: UGC
- Chancellor: Governor of West Bengal
- Vice-Chancellor: Amiya Kumar Panda
- Location: Singur, Hooghly district, West Bengal, India
- Website: www.ranirashmonigreenuniversity.ac.in

Rani Rashmoni Green University is a public state university in Tarakeswar, Hooghly district, West Bengal. It was established in 2018 under the West Bengal Green University Act 2017. This university offers various courses across science and arts disciplines and holds recognition from the University Grants Commission.

== Departments ==
Faculty of Arts : Bengali, English

Faculty of Science: Chemistry, Environmental Science, Computer Science, Nutrition and Public Health.
