= Sister Nibedita Government General Degree College for Girls =

Coordinates: 22°31′23″N 88°20′4″E

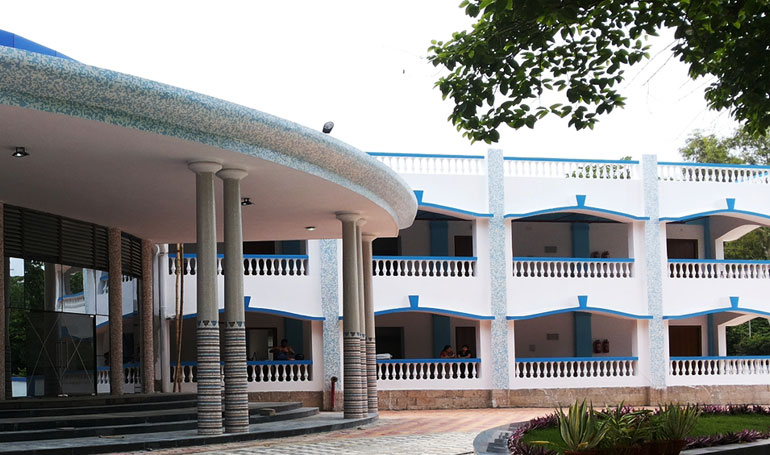
- Type: Government college
- Established: 2015
- Affiliations: University of Calcutta
- Endowment: Government of West Bengal
- Officer in charge: Dr. Sebanti Bhattacharya
- Location: Kolkata, West Bengal, India
- Website: https://www.snggdcg.ac.in

Sister Nibedita Government General Degree College for Girls, Hastings House, is the first government girls' degree college in West Bengal to be established after independence. It is named after Sister Nivedita in the heritage campus of Hastings House, the erstwhile residence of the first Governor General of India. This college is affiliated to University of Calcutta and recognized under Section 2(f) of UGC Act.

== Academics ==
The college offers undergraduate honours and pass courses: -

Subject	Course	Intake capacity
Mathematics	Hons	15
Statistics	Hons	15
Physiology	Hons	15
Geology	Hons	15
Computer Science	Hons	15
Zoology	Hons	15
Botany	Hons	15
Geography	Hons	25
English	Hons	25
Bengali	Hons	25
Sanskrit	Hons	25
Philosophy	Hons	25
Economics	Hons	25
Political Science	Hons	25
Food and Nutrition	Hons	15
History	Hons	25
Physics	Hons	25

== Activities ==
- NSS
- Sports
- Cultural programme
- Seminars
- Publications

== Facilities ==
- Library
- Canteen
- Computer Room
- Student Common Room
- Smart Class
- WiFi Campus
- Sick Room
- Grievance Redressal Cell
- Career Counseling
- Anti Ragging
- Fellowships
