= Kusum Devi Sunderlal Dugar Jain Dental College and Hospital =

Dental college in West Bengal

- Type: Private Dental College & Hospital
- Established: 2017
- Affiliations: DCI, WBUHS
- Principal: Dr. Jayanta Chattopadhyay
- Students: Totals: BDS - 100 per year
- Location: Kolkata, West Bengal, India
- Campus: Urban
- Website: ksdjaindentalcollege.edu.in

Kusum Devi Sunderlal Dugar Jain Dental College and Hospital is a private dental college located in Kolkata, in the Indian state of West Bengal. It is affiliated with the West Bengal University of Health Sciences and is recognized by Dental Council of India. It offers Bachelor of Dental Science (BDS) and Master of Dental Science (MDS) courses.
