= Camellia Institute of Technology =

College in West Bengal

Camellia Institute of Technology Kolkata
- Type: Private
- Established: 2007
- Affiliations: Maulana Abul Kalam Azad University of Technology
- Director: Avijit Das
- Faculty: 50
- Students: 1500 (approx.)
- Location: Kolkata, West Bengal, India; 22°41′06.12″N 88°29′23.85″E
- Campus: Urban
- Approvals: All India Council of Technical Education (AICTE)
- Website: camelliait.ac.in

Camellia Institute of Technology, or (CIT), is a private engineering college located in Kolkata, India. It was founded in 2007 by "Camellia Educational and Manpower Development Trust". The institute is affiliated to West Bengal University of Technology and all courses are approved by AICTE.

== Intake ==
Admission in B. Tech
Program	Approved Year	Approved (Intake)
Computer Science & Engineering (CSE)	2007	60
Information Technology (IT)	2007	60
Electronics & Communication Engineering (ECE)	2007	60
Electrical Engineering (EE)	2009	60
Mechanical Engineering (ME)	2010	120
Civil Engineering(CE)	2013	60

Admission in Diploma
Program	Approved Year	Approved (Intake)
Diploma in Civil Engineering(DCE)	2014	60
Diploma in Mechanical Engineering(DME)	2014	60
