= West Bengal Joint Entrance Examination =

Examination for admission to engineering colleges in India

- Acronym: WBJEE
- Type: OMR sheet based (Pen & Paper)
- Administrator: West Bengal Joint Entrance Examinations Board
- Skills tested: Physics, Chemistry and Mathematics
- Purpose: Admission into UG Courses in Engineering/Technology, Pharmacy and Architecture of different Universities, Government Colleges as well as Self Financing, Private Engineering & Technological Institutes in the State of West Bengal
- Year started: 1962 (64 years ago)
- Duration: Total 4 hour including 2 papers. 2 hours for each paper.
- Score range: −155 to +200
- Score validity: 1 year
- Offered: Conducted once per year
- Restrictions on attempts: No attempt limits
- Regions: India, specially West Bengal
- Languages: English language, Bengali language
- Annual number of test takers: ▼1,01,643 (2025) ▲1,42,694 (2024) ▲1,24,919 (2023) ▲81,393 (2022) ▲65,170 (2021) ▲73,119 (2020)
- Fee: ₹500 for General (Male) Candidate; ₹400 for General (Female) Candidate; ₹300 for Third Gender Candidate; ₹400 for SC/ ST/ OBC-A/ OBC-B/ EWS/ PwD Male Candidate; ₹300 for SC/ ST/ OBC-A/ OBC-B/ EWS/ PwD Female Candidate
- Qualification rate: ▲99.53% (2024) ▼99.40% (2023) ▲99.85% (2022) ▲99.50% (2021) ▼95.23% (2020)
- Website: wbjeeb.nic.in/wbjee/

West Bengal Joint Entrance Examination (WBJEE) is a state-government (West Bengal) controlled centralized test, conducted by the West Bengal Joint Entrance Examinations Board for admission into Undergraduate Courses (like B.E. / B.Tech. / B.Pharm. etc.) in Engineering/Technology, Pharmacy and Architecture of different Universities, Government Colleges as well as Self Financing, Private Institutes in the State of West Bengal, India.

The test is taken after the 12th grade for admission to Undergraduate Courses which is called as Bachelor's degree. The exam can be taken by those who studied physics, Chemistry, Mathematics and English in the 10+2 level as these subjects are tested in the examination.

In 2024, a total of 1,42,694 candidates appeared for the WBJEE 2024 exam and 1,42,023 passed the exam. Students of West Bengal Council of Higher Secondary Education, Central Board of Secondary Education and the Council for the Indian School Certificate Examinations board take the test.

Till the year 2016, the exam was also used as an entrance exam for the state medical colleges. Till then, it was also known as the West Bengal Joint Entrance Examination Joint Entrance for Medical (WBJEEM).

== History ==
From 2012, the old pattern was phased out and the WBJEE would consist of only MCQ questions which differed from the previous years by the fact that 2 Marks Short answers type questions were replaced by MCQ with the same weightage of marks.

In 2016 there was a different type of pattern in Biology question paper.

Category-I consists of (Q.1 to Q.90) carrying one mark each, for which only one option is correct. Category-II consists of (Q.91 to Q.105) carrying two marks each, for which only one option is correct. Category-III consists of (Q.106 to Q.120) carrying two marks each, for which one or more than one option may be correct.

Starting from 2012, all papers consist of 80 MCQ type question divided in two section. Section one consists of 60 MCQs of 1 marks each and Section two consists of the remaining 20 MCQs of 2 marks each. Negative marking is applicable. 30% of the total marks of a question will be deducted for every incorrect answer.

In 2006, the WBJEE contained only objective-type MCQ (Multiple Choice Question) type questions. This announcement attracted mixed reactions with some applauding it as a step towards the future while others have said that opting for MCQ when other tests were slowly phasing out MCQ because of studies showing MCQ failed to properly judge aptitude is a folly.

The WBJEE 2008 was Postponed Due To Paper Leak, after the Physics, Chemistry and Biology papers were leaked. Two persons, Arun Chowdhury and Mihir Dandapatt, were arrested on Saturday in West Midnapore's Ghatal, where the three papers were being sold for Rs 2.5 lacs.

WBJEE 2011 exam was postponed from 17 April 2011 to 22 May due to election date issues in West Bengal.

For 2020–2021 academic session, the Board conducted the Common Entrance Examination for admission to Undergraduate Courses in Engineering & Technology, Pharmacy and Architecture in Universities, Govt. Colleges and Self-Financed Institutes in the State.

== Participating Institutes ==
Various colleges intake students based on WBJEE Ranks. Total 93 institutes are officially taking admission through this Entrance Exam. The WBJEEB board itself conducts a centralized counselling session for students with valid WBJEE General Merit Rank (GMR) or Pharmacy Merit Rank (PMR) where colleges are allotted to them. 11 state universities, 9 state government engineering colleges, 1 state government pharmacy college, 1 central government engineering college, 8 private universities and 63 private engineering colleges allow admission through this exam.

The list of participating institutes are the following:

List of Engineering Universities
List of Government Engineering Universities
Rank	Name	Est.	City	Affiliation	Type	Degrees Offered (Engineering Only)	Ref.
1	Jadavpur University	1955	Kolkata	Government of West Bengal	Public	B.E., M.E., Ph.D.	
2	UCSTA Calcutta University	1914	Kolkata	Calcutta University, Government of West Bengal	Public	B.Tech., M.Tech., Ph.D.	
3	UIT Burdwan University	1999	Burdwan	Burdwan University, Government of West Bengal	Public	B.E., M.E., Ph.D.	
4	Kalyani University	1960	Kalyani	Government of West Bengal	Public	B.Tech., M.Tech., Ph.D.	
5	Bidhan Chandra Krishi Viswavidyalaya	1974	Mohanpur	Government of West Bengal	Public	B.Tech., M.Tech., Ph.D.	
6	Uttar Banga Krishi Viswavidyalaya	2001	Pundibari	Government of West Bengal	Public	B.Tech.	
7	West Bengal University of Animal and Fishery Sciences	1995	Mohanpur	Government of West Bengal	Public	B.Tech., M.Tech., Ph.D.	
8	Maulana Abul Kalam Azad University of Technology	2001	Haringhata	Government of West Bengal	Public	B.Tech., M.Tech., Ph.D.	
9	Kazi Nazrul University	2012	Asansol	Government of West Bengal	Public	B.Tech.	
10	Aliah University	2008	Kolkata	Government of West Bengal	Public	B.Tech., M.Tech., Ph.D.	
List of Self-financed Engineering Universities
Rank	Name	Est.	City	Affiliation	Type	Degrees Offered (Engineering Only)	Ref.
11	Adamas University	2014	Barasat	AICTE	Private	B.Tech., M.Tech., Ph.D.	
12	University of Engineering & Management, Kolkata	2015	Kolkata	AICTE	Private	B.Tech., M.Tech., Ph.D.	
13	JIS University	2014	Agarpara	AICTE	Private	B.Tech., M.Tech., Ph.D.	
14	Seacom Skills University	2014	Bolpur	AICTE	Private	B.Tech., M.Tech.	
15	Sister Nivedita University	2017	Kolkata	AICTE	Private	B.Tech., M.Tech., Ph.D.	
16	Swami Vivekananda University, Barrackpore	2020	Barrackpore	AICTE	Private	B.Tech., M.Tech.	
17	Techno India University	2012	Salt Lake Sector-V	AICTE	Private	B.Tech., M.Tech., Ph.D.	

List of state government-funded engineering colleges
Rank	Name	Established	Location	Type	Ref
1	Kalyani Government Engineering College	1995	Kalyani, Nadia	State	
2	Jalpaiguri Government Engineering College	1961	Jalpaiguri	State	
3	Government College of Engineering and Leather Technology	1919	Salt Lake City, Kolkata	State	
4	Ramkrishna Mahato Government Engineering College	2016	Joypur, Purulia	State	
5	Government College of Engineering & Textile Technology Serampore	1908	Serampore, Hooghly district	State	
6	Government College of Engineering and Ceramic Technology	1941	Kolkata	State	
7	Government College of Engineering & Textile Technology, Berhampore	1927	Berhampore, Murshidabad	State	
8	Alipurduar Government Engineering and Management College	2023	Alipurduar	State	
9	Cooch Behar Government Engineering College	2016	Cooch Behar	State	

List of private engineering colleges
	Institution
1	Abacus Institute of Engineering & Management, Mogra in the district of Hooghly
2	Academy of Technology, Adisaptagram, in the district of Hooghly
3	Asansol Engineering College, Asansol, Paschim Bardhaman
4	B. P. Poddar Institute of Management & Technology, Kolkata
5	Bankura Unnayini Institute of Engineering, Bankura
6	Bengal College of Engineering & Technology, Durgapur, Paschim Bardhaman
7	Bengal Institute of Technology & Management, Santiniketan, Birbhum
8	Bengal Institute of Technology, Dhapa, Kolkata
9	Birbhum Institute of Engineering and Technology, Suri, Birbhum
10	Budge Budge Institute of Technology, Budge Budge
11	Calcutta Institute of Engineering and Management, Tollygunj, Kolkata
12	Calcutta Institute of Technology, Uluberia, Howrah
13	Camellia Institute of Engineering and Technology, Burdwan
14	Camellia Institute of Technology and Management, Bainchi, in the district of Hooghly
15	Camellia Institute of Technology, Madhyamgram, North 24 Parganas
16	Camellia School of Engineering & Technology, Barasat, North 24 Parganas
17	College of Engineering and Management, Kolaghat, Purba Medinipur
18	Darjeeling Hill Institute of Technology and Management, Takdah, Darjeeling
19	Dr. B. C. Roy Engineering College, Durgapur, Paschim Bardhaman
20	Dr . Sudhir Chandra Sur Institute of Technology and Sports Complex, Dum Dum, North 24 Parganas
21	Dream Institute of Technology, Thakurpukur, Kolkata
22	Dumkal Institute of Engineering and Technology, Dumkal, Murshidabad
23	Durgapur Institute of Advanced Technology and Management, Durgapur, Paschim Bardhaman
24	Elitte College of Engineering, Sodepur, North 24 Parganas
25	Future Institute of Engineering and Management, Sonarpur, South 24 Parganas
26	Future Institute of Technology, Garia, South 24 Parganas
27	Gargi Memorial Institute of Technology, Baruipur, South 24 Parganas
28	Global Institute of Management and Technology, Krishnanagar, Nadia
29	Greater Kolkata College of Engineering and Management, Baruipur, South 24 Parganas
30	Guru Nanak Institute of Technology, Panihati, North 24 Parganas
31	Haldia Institute of Technology, Haldia, Purba Medinipur
32	Hemnalini Memorial College of Engineering, Haringhata, Nadia district
33	Heritage Institute of Technology, Kolkata
34	Hooghly Engineering and Technology College, Hooghly in Hooghly district
35	Ideal Institute of Engineering, Kalyani, Nadia
36	IMPS College of Engineering and Technology, Malda
37	Institute of Engineering and Management, Salt Lake, Kolkata
38	Institute of Science and Technology, Paschim Medinipur
39	JIS College of Engineering, Kalyani, Nadia
40	JLD Engineering and Management College, Baruipur, South 24 Parganas
41	Kanad Institute of Engineering and Management, Mankar, Purba Bardhaman
42	Mallabhum Institute of Technology, Bishnupur, Bankura
43	MCKV Institute of Technology, Liluah, Howrah
44	Meghnad Saha Institute of Technology, Kolkata
45	Modern Institute of Engineering and Technology, Bandel, Hooghly
46	Murshidabad College of Engineering and Technology, Murshidabad
47	Narula Institute of Technology, Agarpara, North 24 Parganas
48	Neotia Institute of Technology Management and Science, Diamond Harbour Road, Amira, South 24 Parganas
49	Netaji Subhash Engineering College, Garia, South 24 Parganas
50	NSHM Knowledge Campus, Durgapur and Kolkata
51	Om Dayal Group of Institutions, Uluberia, Howrah
52	Pailan College of Management and Technology, Joka, South 24 Parganas
53	RCC Institute of Information Technology, Kolkata
54	Regent Education and Research Foundation, Barasat, North 24 Parganas
55	Sanaka Education Trusts Group of Institutions, Durgapur, Paschim Bardhaman
56	Seacom Engineering College, Sankrail, Howrah
57	Siliguri Institute of Technology, Siliguri, Darjeeling
58	St. Mary's Technical Campus, Barasat, North 24 Parganas
59	St. Thomas College of Engineering and Technology, Khidirpur, Kolkata
60	Supreme Knowledge Foundation Group of Institutions, Mankundu, Hooghly district
61	Swami Vivekananda Institute of Science and Technology, Sonarpur, South 24 Parganas
62	Surendra Institute of Engineering and Management, Siliguri, Darjeeling
63	Techno Engineering College, Banipur, North 24 Parganas
64	Techno International, Batanagar, South 24 Parganas
65	Techno International, Rajarhat, North 24 Parganas
66	Techno Main, Sector V, Salt Lake, North 24 Parganas

== Pattern of the exam ==
WBJEE exam is conducted through two papers, namely Paper-I and Paper-II. Paper-I consists of Mathematics and Paper-II consists of Physics and Chemistry. All questions are Multiple-Choice Questions (MCQ), with four options for each question. There will be three categories of questions in each subject. The number of questions, as well as the maximum marks for each, are given in the following table:

WBJEE Marks Distribution and pattern
Subject	Category-1 Each Q carries 1 (One)mark (-ve marks =- 1/4)	Category-2 Each Q carries 2 (two)marks (-ve marks =- 1/2)	Category-3 Each Q carries 2 (two)marks (No -ve marks)	Total Number of Questions	Total Marks
	No. of Q	No. of Q	No. of Q		
Mathematics	50	15	10	75	100
Physics	30	5	5	40	50
Chemistry	30	5	5	40	50

- Questions are to be answered on a specially designed optical machine-readable response (OMR) sheet, which will be evaluated by the Optical Mark Recognition method. Thus, it is very important to follow the correct way of marking.
- Candidates will indicate their response to the questions by darkening the appropriate circle/bubble entirely with a blue/black ink ball point pen. Pen will be provided by the WBJEEB.
- Any other kind of marking, e.g., filling the circle/bubble incompletely, filling with pencil, cross mark, tick mark, dot mark, circular mark, over writing, scratching, erasing, white ink(prohibited), marking outside the circle/bubble etc. may lead to wrong/partial/ambiguous reading of the response. WBJEEB will be, in no way, responsible for such an eventuality, and this may lead to the cancellation of the OMR sheet.
- Response marking cannot be edited/changed/erased/modified.

Category-1

a) Only one option is correct.

b) The correct response will yield 1 (one) mark for each question.

c) The incorrect response will yield -¼ (25% negative) marks for each question.

d) For any combination of more than one option, even if it contains the correct option, the said answer will be treated as incorrect and will yield -¼ (25% negative) marks.

e) Not attempting the question will fetch zero mark.

Category-2

a) Only one option is correct.

b) The correct response will yield 2(two) marks for each question.

c) The incorrect response will yield -1/2 (25% negative) marks for each question.

d) For any combination of more than one option, even if it contains the correct option, the said answer will be treated as incorrect and will yield -1/2 (25% negative) marks.

e) Not attempting the question will fetch zero mark.

Category-3

a) One or more option(s) is/are correct.

b) Marking all correct option(s) only will yield 2 (two) marks.

c) For any combination of answers containing one or more incorrect options, the said answer will be treated as wrong, yielding a zero mark even if one or more of the chosen option(s) is/are correct.

d) For partially correct answers, i.e., when all right options are not marked and also no incorrect options are marked, marks awarded =2 × (no of correct options marked) / total no of actually correct option(s).

e) Not attempting the question will fetch zero mark.

== Ranking procedure ==
• Candidates appearing in both paper-I and paper-II are eligible for a General Merit Rank (GMR) and a Pharmacy Merit Rank (PMR). Such candidates may be considered for admission in all courses of Engineering and Pharmacy.

• Candidates appearing only in paper-II are eligible for PMR only. Such candidates may be considered for admission into Pharmacy courses only (except in Jadavpur University).

• Candidates appearing only in paper-I are not eligible for any rank.

=== Ranking methodology and merit lists ===
WBJEEB will prepare merit ranks based on the candidates’ scores in the Common Entrance Test. Individual candidates will be able to view and download their rank cards, which will contain their score and rank. WBJEEB does not publish any rank/score list for the public to ensure confidentiality for individual candidate.

Based on the papers (subjects) that appeared for and the corresponding marks scored, two separate Merit Ranks shall be generated in the following method:

A. General Merit Rank (GMR):

a) A sequence of General Merit Rank (GMR) will be prepared based on the total scores obtained in Paper-I and Paper-II, taken together.

b) Ranking shall be done in descending order of total marks scored in all the subjects.

c) Separate reserved category merit positions will also be indicated for the respective category of students, e.g., SC Rank, ST Rank, OBC-A Rank, OBC-B Rank, EWS Rank, PWD Rank, TFW Rank, etc., as applicable.

d) Admission to all Engineering / Technology / Architecture Courses and the Pharmacy Course in Jadavpur University will be based only on GMR.

e) Sequencing orders for counselling/allotment of seats/admission will be based only on GMR (not category ranks). Category ranks will only be reflected in the rank card to provide an information regarding category wise position of the respective candidate.

B. Pharmacy Merit Rank (PMR):

a) A sequence of Pharmacy Merit Rank (PMR) will be prepared based on the score in paper II only, i.e., Physics and Chemistry.

b) Ranking shall be done in the descending order of marks scored in paper-II.

c) Separate reserved category merit positions will also be indicated for respective categories of students, e.g., SC Rank, ST Rank, OBC-A Rank, OBC-B Rank, EWS Rank, PWD Rank, TFW Rank, etc., as applicable.

d) Admission to all Pharmacy Courses except in Jadavpur University shall be made based on PMR.

e) Sequencing orders for counselling/allotment of seats/admission will be based only on PMR (not on category ranks). Category ranks will only be reflected in the rank card to provide an information regarding category wise position of the respective candidate

C. Category ranks:

These are generated based on the category information given by the candidates during the online application, but documents are verified by the allotted institute during counselling. Hence, the candidate's certificates/ documents/ proofs must be valid as of the verification date. If any candidate's claim is found invalid during verification, his/her category rank will be cancelled, and the candidate will be considered in the general category. The category ranks of other candidates will not be revised.

WBJEE Previous Year OR CR Details

WBJEEB board officially publish every year the Opening and Closing Rank (OR-CR) and Cut off Details to their official website after WBJEE Admission and E-Counselling Process over. In eWBJEE portal, WBJEE Board updated previous years OR CR details. WBJEEB doesn't Publish or Provide any Marks vs Ranks Official information in this regard.
