= RCC Institute of Information Technology =

Public engineering college in Kolkata, West Bengal

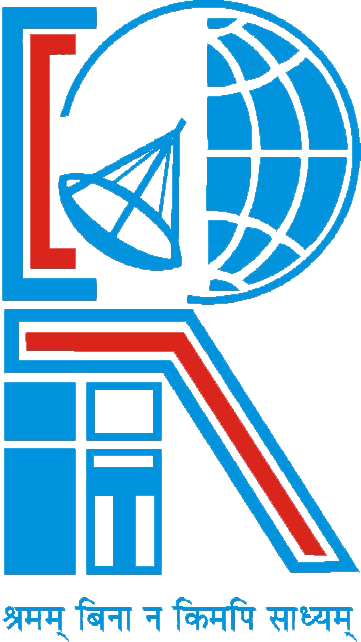
- Motto: श्रमम् बिना न किमपि साध्यम्
- Motto in English: Nothing can be achieved without hard work
- Type: Public Engineering College; aided by World Bank; under TEQIP (II); (Government of West Bengal), (Govt. of India)
- Established: 1999; 27 years ago
- Founders: Government of West Bengal; Government of India
- Affiliations: MAKAUT
- Principal: Prof. (Dr.) Ashoke Mondal
- Dean: Sarbojit Mukherjee
- Location: Kolkata, India; 22.5593°N 88.3967°E
- Campus: 4.63 acres; Urban
- Approved: IEI; NBA; AICTE; UGC
- Website: www.rcciit.org
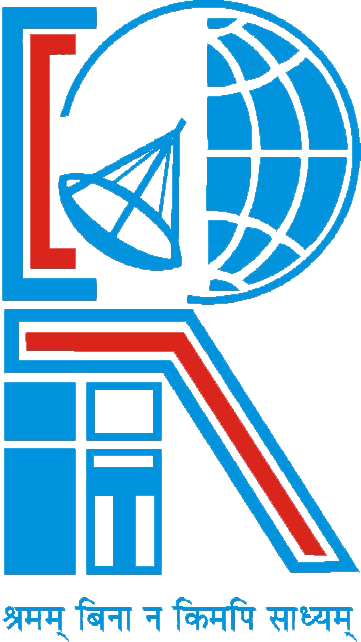

- Location within West Bengal Location within India
- This college is under MAKAUT.

RCC Institute of Information Technology (RCCIIT) is a government sponsored engineering institute which is located in Kolkata, West Bengal, India. The institute was established in 1999 by Government of West Bengal collaboration with Ministry of Electronics and Information Technology (MeitY), Government of India and academically affiliated to Maulana Abul Kalam Azad University of Technology. It is considered as one of the best engineering institutes under West Bengal Joint Entrance Examination. Regional Computer Centre or RCC, Calcutta (now NIELIT, Kolkata) An Autonomous Scientific Society of Ministry of Electronics and Information Technology (MeitY), Government of India is an asset of the State. All the faculties of this institution are recruited by the Government of West Bengal.

== History ==
The RCC Institute of Information Technology (RCCIIT) was set up in 1999 headed by Jadavpur University.

Initially, the institution started with only three streams viz. Bachelor's in Computer Science and Information Technology and Master's in Computer Application. In 2006, a new stream was added to the bachelor's degree - Electronics and Communication Engineering. From 2010 onwards many new streams and master's degree in different Engineering courses were added.

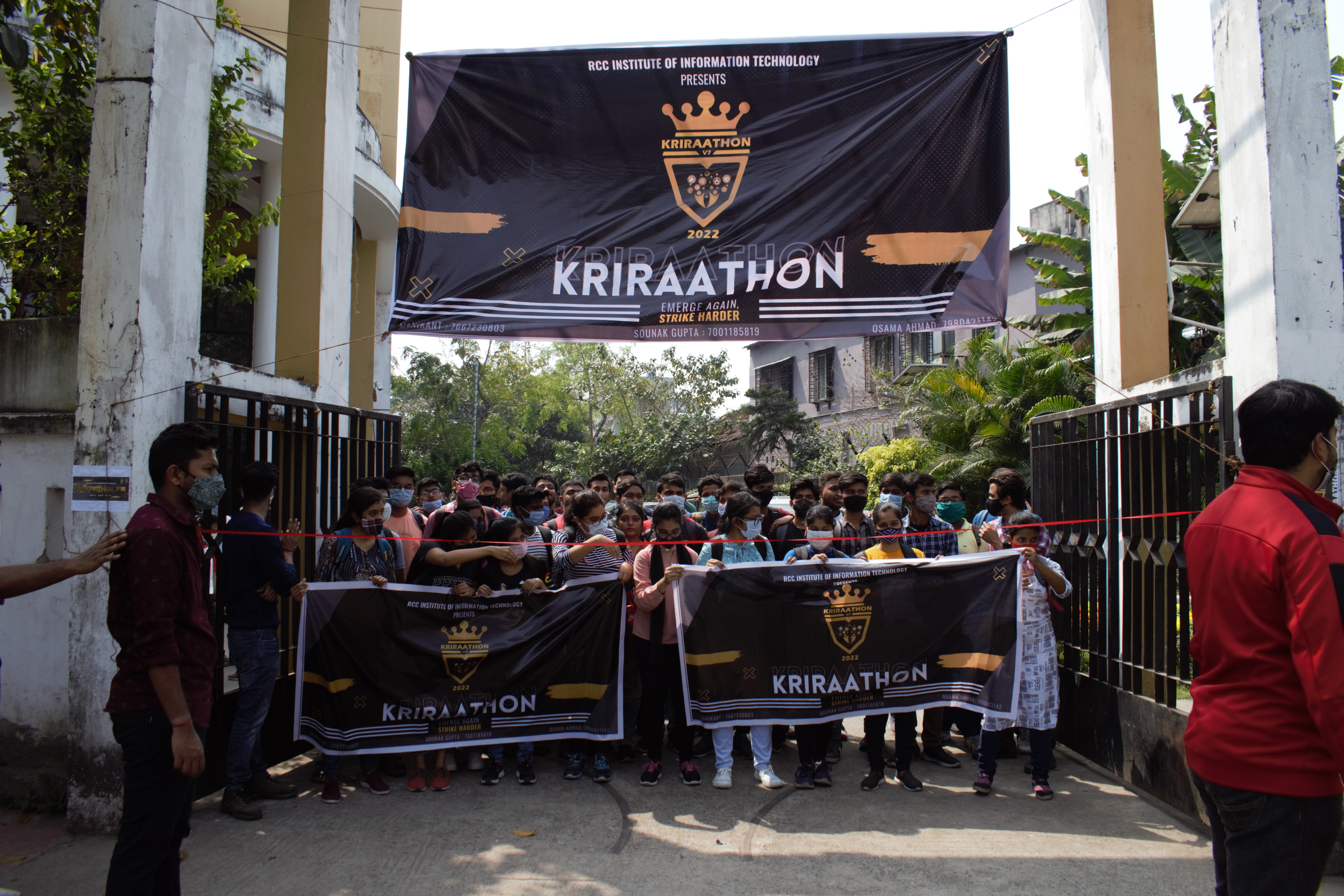
Kriraathon 2022

== Campus ==
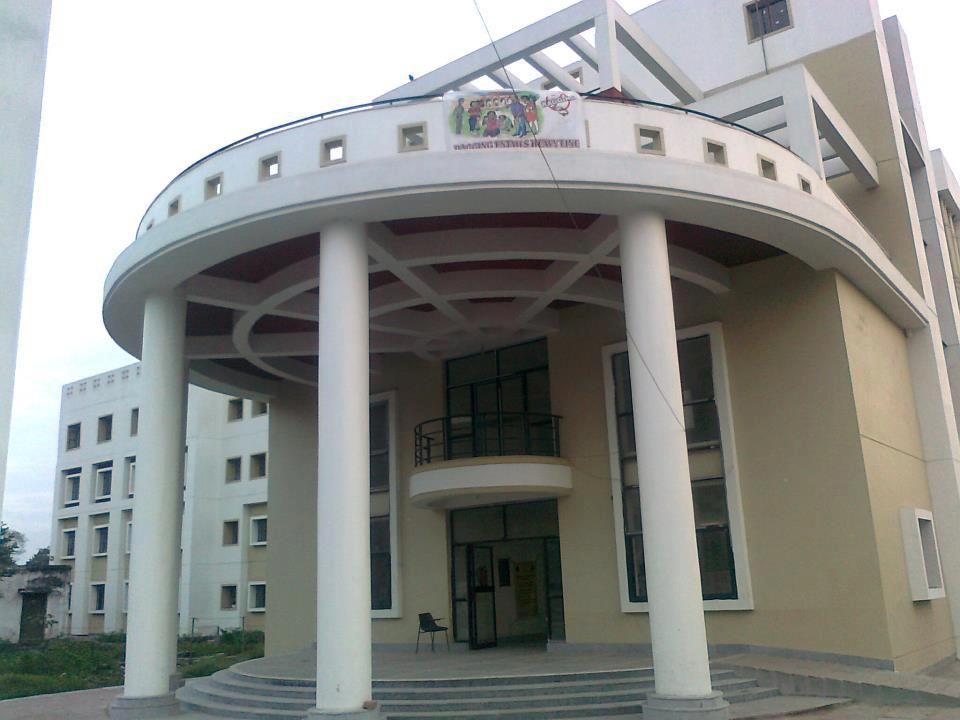
New Campus of RCCIIT

The college campuses are located at Canal South Road, Beliaghata, Kolkata-700015. The old campus is housed at the old Government College of Engineering and Leather Technology campus. A new campus is about 20 metres from the old campus.

The campus is a 10 minutes drive away from Eastern Metropolitan Bypass (near Chingrighata-2 km (1.2 mi) away). The nearest airport is Netaji Subhash Chandra Bose International Airport at Dum Dum, Kolkata. It is a 10 minutes walk away from the nearest bus stop Beliaghata (CIT More) and is well connected with the two city stations, Howrah and Sealdah, 3 km..

There is no hostel facility in this college.

== Organization and Administration ==
The institute is a unit of the RCC Institute of Information Technology, an autonomous society of Department of Higher Education, Government of West Bengal, with part funding from the Government of West Bengal. This provides the institution with a degree of autonomy, while being administrated and funded by the Government. It has been selected for a TEQIP grant in the govt/govt aided category by the World Bank

The institute is currently headed by Prof. (Dr.) Ashok Mondal as the principal, and (Dr.) Anindita Ganguly, Director of Technical Education, Department of Higher Education, Govt of West Bengal who has been given the responsibility as Administrator, by the Department of Higher Education, Government of West Bengal.

== Academics ==
=== Admissions ===
Admission to the undergraduate B.Tech. courses is done through the WBJEE or JEE MAIN. Postgraduate admissions are done on the basis of ranks in national entrance examinations like GATE or the state level examination PGET conducted by MAKAUT, WB.

Admission for second year B.Tech courses is through Lateral Entry Scheme. The interested candidate should have Diploma in Engineering or Technology with at least 60% marks from any AICTE recognized Polytechnic Institute.

=== Courses Offered ===
The offered by RCCIIT are:

==== B.Tech Courses (4-year Program) ====
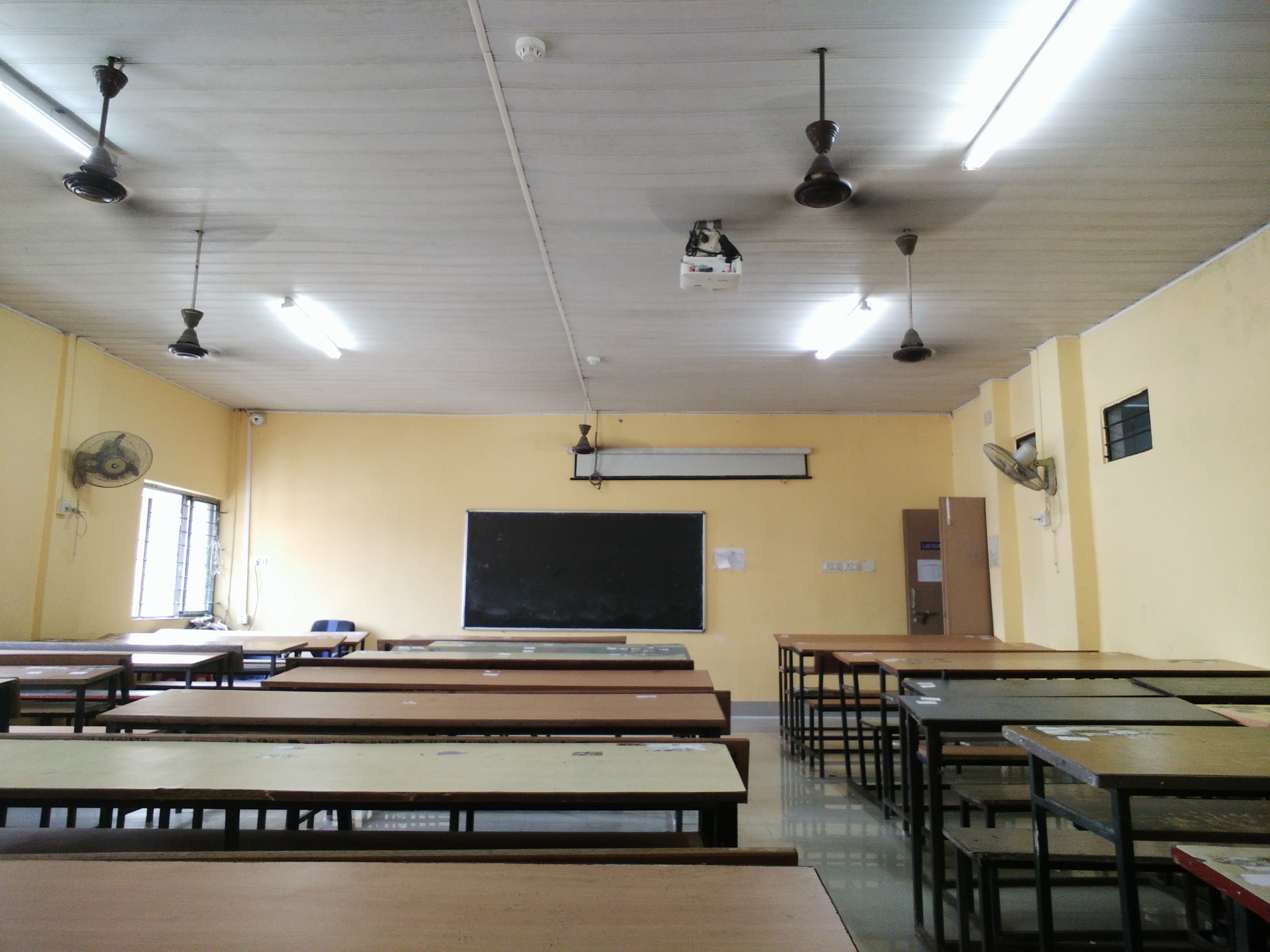
Classroom of RCCIIT

1. Computer Science & Engineering (CSE) (NBA Accredited)
2. Electronics and Communication Engineering (ECE) (NBA Accredited)
3. Information Technology (IT) (NBA Accredited)
4. Electrical Engineering (EE)(NBA Accredited)
5. Computer Science and Engineering (Artificial Intelligence and Machine Learning)
  1. Bachelor of Computer Application (BCA)

The AICTE approved intake for :

1. Computer Science & Engineering - 210
2. Information Technology - 120
3. Electronics and Communication Engineering - 120
4. Electrical Engineering - 60
5. Computer Science and Engineering (Artificial Intelligence and Machine Learning) - 60
6. Bachelor of Computer Application (BCA) - 60
7. Master of Computer Application (MCA) - 90

==== M.Tech Courses (2-year Program) ====
1. Computer Science & Engineering
2. Computer Science & Engineering (Artificial intelligence)
3. VLSI and Microelectronics

RCCIIT has 18 seats for Computer Science & Engineering and Computer Science & Engineering (Artificial intelligence) and 12 seats for VLSI and Microelectronics.

==== Masters in Computer Applications (MCA) ====
RCCIIT also offers Masters in Computer Applications, a two-year degree course with 90 seats.

== Student life ==
=== Freshers Welcome ===
Freshers are welcomed to the institution by their seniors every year with a cultural event known as BIHAAN.

=== Technical Fest ===
The students of the college organize a technical fest every year which sharpens their technical skills known as Techtrix. Software competitions, paper presentations, programming in various languages, technical quiz, robotics and debate competitions are held. Technical colleges from all over the state participate in the competitions. Seminars and exhibitions are also held as a part of this program.

=== Cultural Fest ===
Every year the institute holds an annual fest, Regalia, organized by the students. Students from various institutes compete with others in the fields like drama, choreography, quiz, antakshari, solo and group singing competition, fashion shows, war of bands, and various other fields. Students of the institute perform skits, musical performances and plays. To make it more entertaining skilled performers from different genres are invited. Some major music bands and singers rock the students. Apart from the annual fest, there are other cultural programs, organized around the year where the students get a chance to show their talent.

=== Sports ===
The students organize intra-college and inter-college sports in a variety of games and sports such as table tennis, cricket, football and carrom tournaments. The inter-college sports fest is known as "Game of Thrones".

== Institute Clubs ==
=== Rotaract Club of RCCIIT ===
RCC Institute of Information Technology has its own institute-based Rotaract Club sponsored by the Rotary Club of Calcutta Renaissance. The club was established by the students of RCCIIT on 13 June 2017 with Awsaf Ambar as the Charter President. The purpose of the club is to conduct non-profit social activities for career development and personal growth.

The current president of Rotaract Club of RCCIIT is Rtr. Sumit Anand.

=== Google DSC RCCIIT ===
Google DSC RCCIIT is a newly formed tech club of RCCIIT. Formed in 2021 by Supratik Chakraborty, the club mainly organizes hands-on workshops, hackathons and study jams revolving around numerous technological stacks.

== See also ==
- List of institutions of higher education in West Bengal
- Education in India
- Education in West Bengal
- Government College of Engineering and Leather Technology
- Kalyani Government Engineering College
- Government College of Engineering & Textile Technology Berhampore
- Bankura Unnayani Institute of Engineering
- Engineering education in India
