= Bengal Institute of Technology & Management =

College in West Bengal

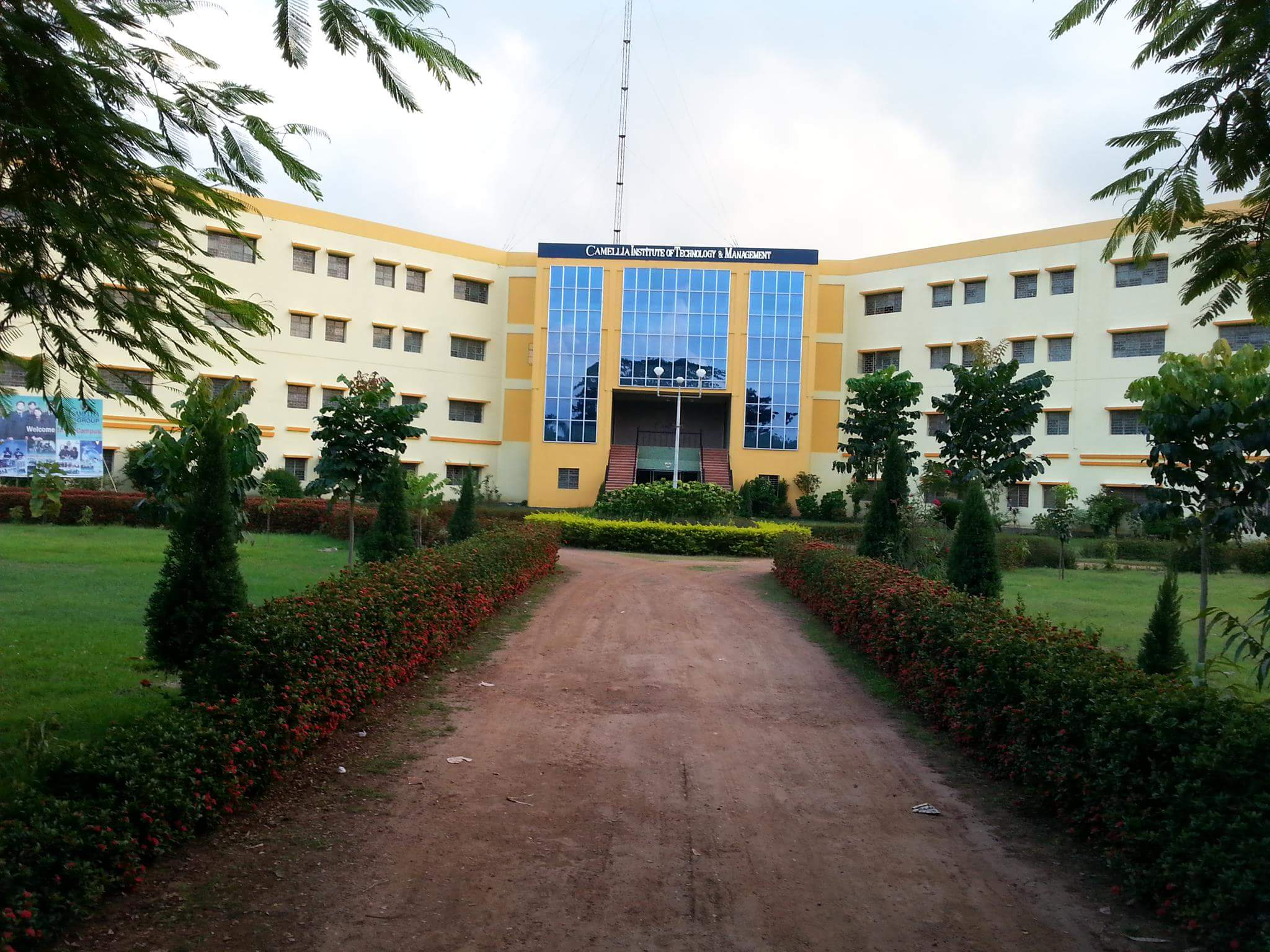
- Academic area
- Motto: Centre of Quality Education & Research
- Type: Private
- Established: 2001; 25 years ago
- Affiliations: MAKAUT, AICTE, WBSCTE
- Director: Subhasis Biswas
- Undergraduates: 5000
- Location: Dwaranda, BYPASS P.O, Sriniketan, Bolpur, West Bengal, 731236, India; 23.6426799°N 87.6268233°E
- Campus: 60 Acres; Rural
- Website: www.bitms.ac.in
- Location in West Bengal Bengal Institute of Technology & Management (India)

Bengal Institute of Technology & Management (BITM) is a self-financing engineering college in West Bengal, India.It was established in 2001 under Camellia Group. It is affiliated with Maulana Abul Kalam Azad University of Technology and all the programmes are approved by the All India Council for Technical Education.

It is located along Sriniketan bypass, Doranda, Bolpur, Birbhum.

== Academics ==
The institute offers undergraduate courses approved under MAKAUT,W.B:

- B.Tech in Electronics and Communication Engineering (ECE) - 4 years (approved intake - 60)
- B.Tech in AI & ML - 4 years (approved intake - 60)
- B.Tech in Electrical Engineering (EE) - 4 years (approved intake - 120)
- B.Tech in Mechanical Engineering (ME) - 4 years (approved intake - 180)
- B.Tech in Computer Science and Engineering (CSE) - 4 years (approved intake - 60)
- B.Tech in Civil Engineering (CE) - 4 years (approved intake - 120)
- B.Tech in Information Technology (IT) - 4 years (approved intake - 30)
- B.Tech in Applied Electronics and Instrumentation Engineering (AEIE) - 4 years (approved intake - )
- Bachelor in Business Administration - 3 years (approved intake - 60)
- Bachelor in Computer Application - 3 years (approved intake - 60)
- Bachelor in Hotel Management - 3 years (approved intake - 60)

The following postgraduate degree programs are offered:

- M.Tech. in Electronics and Communication Engineering (ECE) - 2 years (approved intake - 18)
- M.Tech. in Computer Science & Engineering - 2 years (approved intake - 18)
- M.Tech. in Electrical Engineering (EE) - 2 years (approved intake - 18)
- Master in Business Administration - 2 years (approved intake - 60)
- Master in Computer Application - 2 years (approved intake - 60)

It also offers diploma courses:

- Civil Engineering
- Electrical Engineering
- Mechanical Engineering

== See also ==
- List of institutions of higher education in West Bengal
- Education in India
- Education in West Bengal
