= Haldia Institute of Technology =

Engineering institution in West Bengal, India

Coordinates: 22°03′02.15″N 88°04′12.09″E

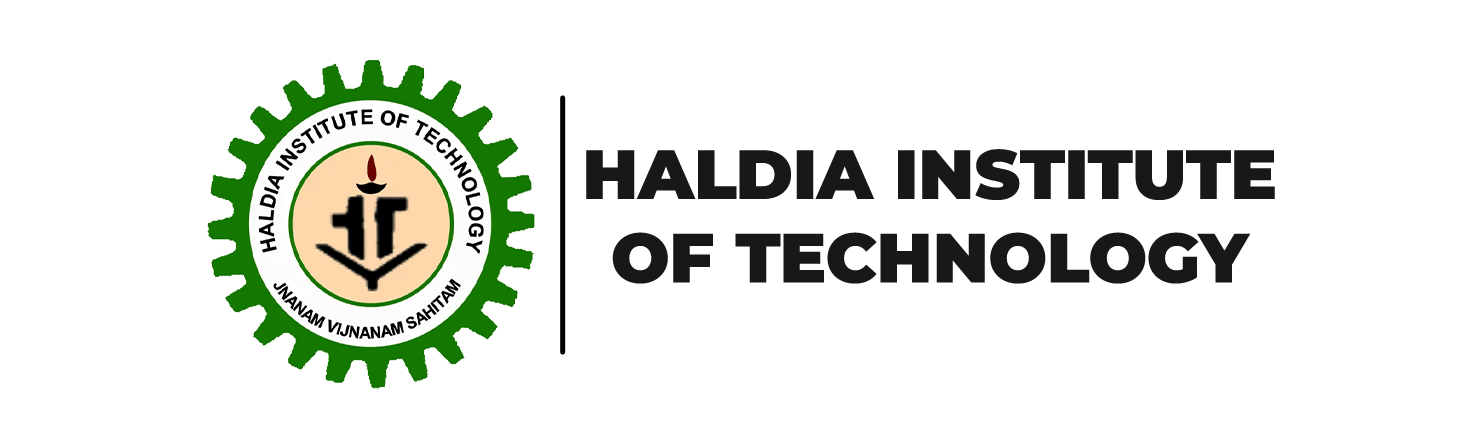
- Motto: "Jnanam Vijnanam Sahitam" (Sanskrit)
- Motto in English: Knowledge with Wisdom
- Type: Autonomous
- Established: 1996; 30 years ago
- Affiliations: AICTE, NAAC, NBA
- Academic affiliations: Maulana Abul Kalam Azad University of Technology
- Chairman: Lakshman Chandra Seth
- Principal: Dr. Tarun Kanti Jana
- Director: Manabendra Nath Bandhopadhyay
- Students: 5,100
- Undergraduates: 4,863
- Postgraduates: 250
- Location: Hatiberia, ICARE Complex, Haldia, Purba Medinipur, West Bengal, 721657, India
- Campus: 0.15 km^{2} (37 acres); Urban
- Website: www.hithaldia.ac.in

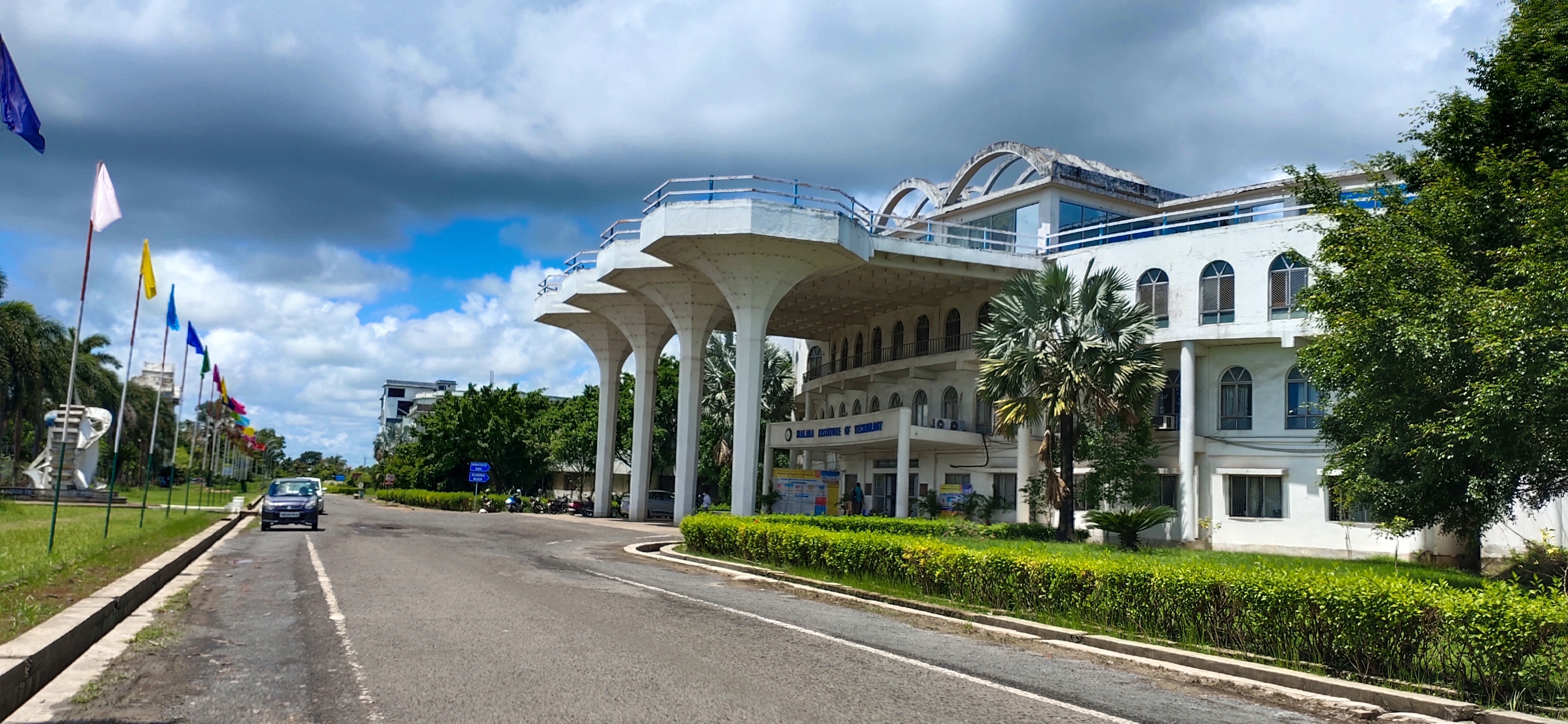
Four pillars : A popular spot within the campus

Haldia Institute of Technology, better known as HIT Haldia, is an autonomous engineering institute in Haldia, West Bengal, India, approved by All India Council for Technical Education (AICTE), New Delhi, and affiliated to Maulana Abul Kalam Azad University of Technology (MAKAUT). It is an institution maintained by ICARE (Indian Center for Advancement of Research and Education, Haldia ICARE, Haldia), a non-profit making voluntary organization. It is one of the oldest accredited academic institution catering technical education in West Bengal. HIT has an enclave campus of approximately 37 acres (0.15 km^{2}).

The Institute offers 13 B.Tech, 5 M.Tech and MCA, MBA courses.

== Campus ==
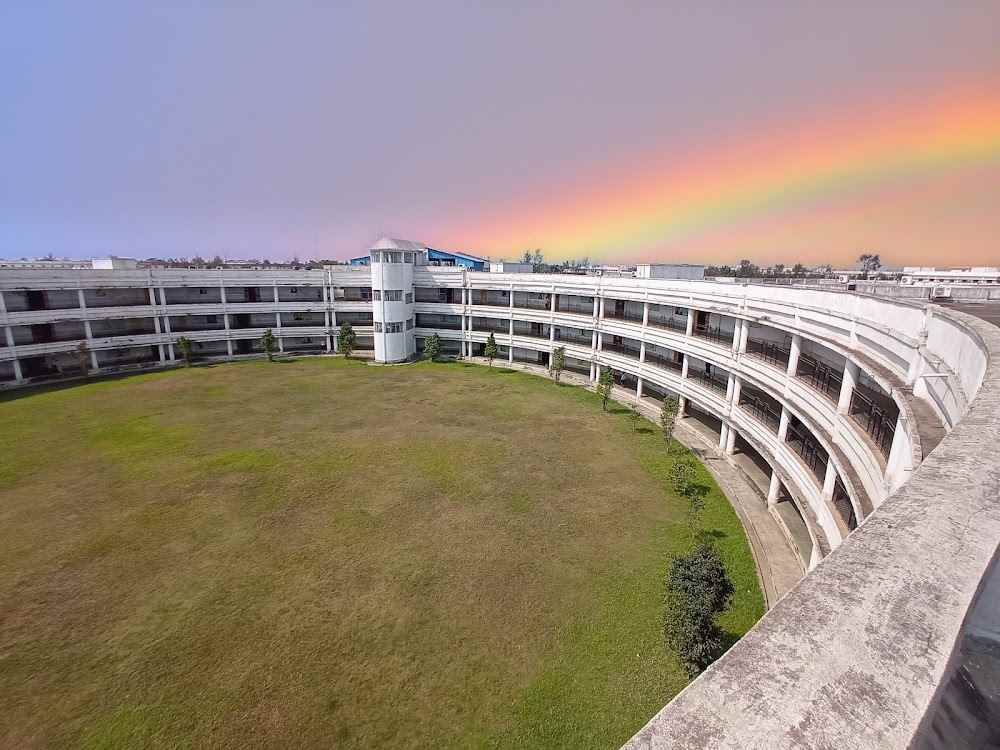
Central circular building

The campus comprises

- Administrative block
- 9 Academic blocks
- 14 Student Hostels
- Library
- Departmental store
- Post Office
- Laundry
- Medical Store
- Bank
- ATM(24x7)
- Restaurant
- Open air cafetaria
- Recreational building
- Football ground
- Basketball court
- Cricket ground

=== Student Housing ===
The college campus provides us with separate housing facility or dormitory (hostels) for boys and girls :

- Boys Hostels
  - Newton Hall of Residence
  - Galileo Hall of Residence
  - Darwin Hall of Residence
  - Ranichak Boys Hostel
  - Balaji Boys Hostel

- Girls Hostels
  - Tamalika Ponda Seth Hall of Residence
  - Matangini Hall of Residence
  - Pritilata Waddedar Hall of Residence
- Foreign Hostel
  - A.P.C Roy Boys Hostel

== Schools and Departments ==
=== Undergraduate ===
Haldia Institute of Technology has the following schools and departments:

- School of Engineering
  - Department of Mechanical engineering
  - Department of Electrical engineering
  - Department of Applied Electronics and Instrumentation Engineering
  - Department of Civil engineering
- School of Applied Sciences & Humanities
  - Department of Applied Sciences
- School of Chemical, Food & BioTechnology
  - Department of Chemical engineering
  - Department of Biotechnology
  - Department of Food technology
- School of Electronics, Computer & Informatics
  - Department of Computer science and engineering
  - Department of Computer science and engineering (Data science)
  - Department of Computer science and engineering (Cyber Security)
  - Department of Computer science and engineering (Artificial intelligence and Machine learning)
  - Department of Information technology
  - Department of Electronic and Communications Engineering

=== Postgraduate ===
- School of Management & Social Sciences
  - Department of MBA

== Student life ==
=== Cultural and Non-academic Activities ===
The annual Science & Technology festival of HIT is PRAYUKTI.

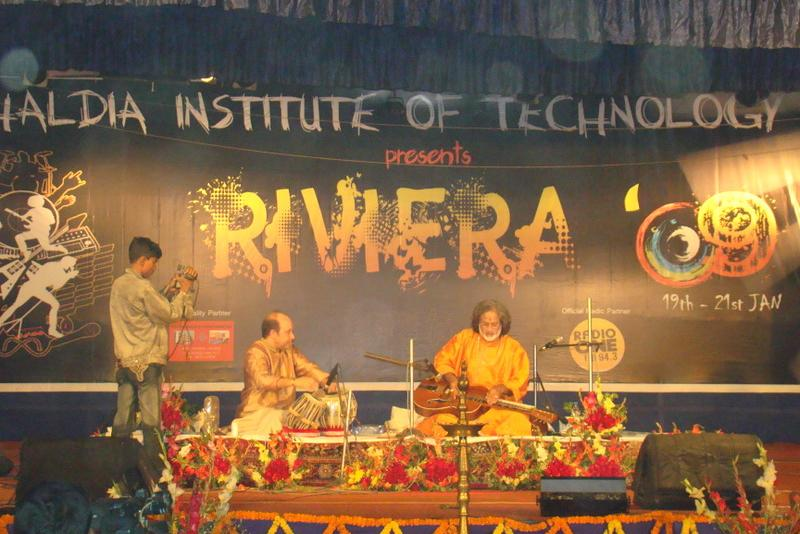
The yearly cultural festival – RIVIERA

The annual cultural festival RIVIERA, usually held in the month of May–June is an event hosted by the student body.

== Accreditation ==
Haldia Institute of Technology is accredited by the National Assessment and Accreditation Council (NAAC) with an "A" grade in 2018, with CGPA of 3.31 on 4 point scale. Most of the courses are provisionally accredited by the National Board of Accreditation (NBA).

== Ranking ==
University and college rankings

Engineering – India
- NIRF (2024): 201-300

The National Institutional Ranking Framework (NIRF) ranked the college between 201-300 in the engineering rankings in 2024.

== See also ==
- List of institutions of higher education in West Bengal
