= B. P. Poddar Institute of Management & Technology =

College in West Bengal

B. P. Poddar Institute of Management and Technology
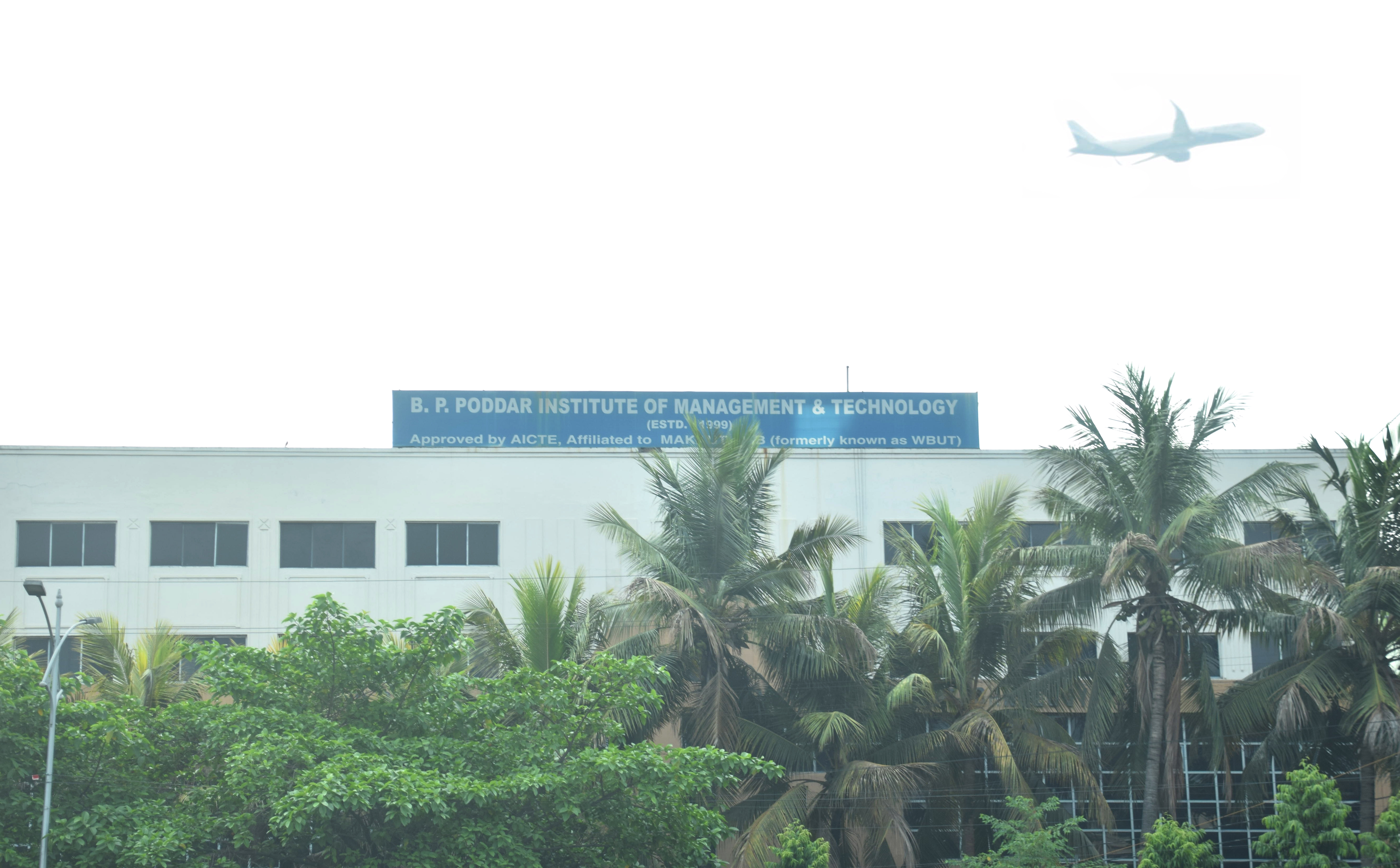
- Type: Private
- Established: 1999; 27 years ago
- Affiliations: Maulana Abul Kalam Azad University of Technology
- Chairman: Arun Poddar
- Principal: Sutapa Mukherjee
- Dean: B. N. Chatterjee
- Director: Subir Choudhury
- Undergraduates: 2440
- Location: 137 V.I.P. Road, Kolkata, West Bengal, 700052, India; 22.6296904°N 88.433944°E
- Campus: Urban
- Approvals: AICTE
- Website: www.bppimt.ac.in
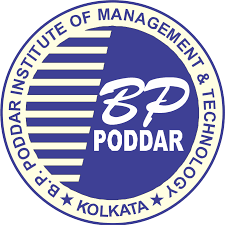

- Location within Kolkata Location within India

B. P. Poddar Institute of Management and Technology or BPPIMT is an undergraduate college in West Bengal, India. It was established in 1999 by B.P. Poddar Foundation for Education. It ranks as one of the best engineering colleges in Kolkata, West Bengal under WBJEE. The college is affiliated with Maulana Abul Kalam Azad University of Technology and all the programmes are approved by the All India Council for Technical Education and the courses C.S.E., E.C.E., E.E., I.T. are accredited by NBA (National Board of Accreditation).

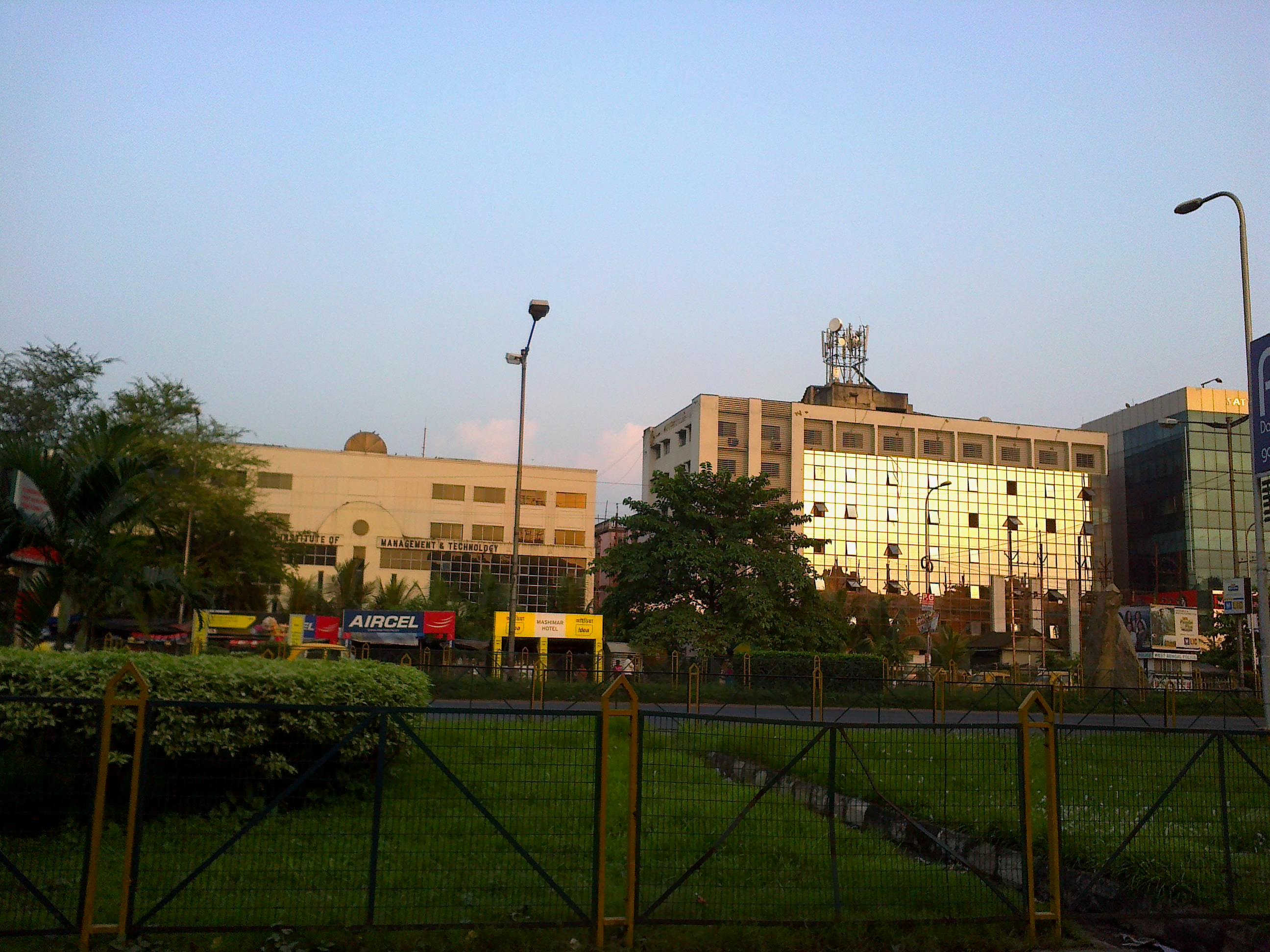
BPPIMT, VIP Road Campus

The engineering campus is located at VIP Road, near Haldirams, Kolkata. It has a second campus in Sector V, Salt Lake which specializes in offering undergraduate programmes in the field of Management and Technology.

The admission office of B.P. Poddar Institute of Management and Technology is located at 87, Park Street (Beside Park Street Police Station), Kolkata-700016.

== Academics ==
The institute offers six under-graduate courses:-

- B.Tech in Electronics and Communication Engineering (ECE) - 4 years [Approved intake - 120]
- B.Tech in Electrical Engineering (EE) - 4 years [Approved intake - 30]
- B.Tech in Computer Science and Engineering (CSE) - 4 years [Approved intake - 120]
- B.Tech in Information Technology (IT) - 4 years [Approved intake - 120]
- BCA - 3 years [Approved intake - 90]
- BBA - 3 years [Approved intake - 120]

The institute offers one post-graduate course:-

- Masters in Computer Application - 2 years [Approved intake - 40]

== Department of Electronics & Communication Engineering (ECE) ==
The department offers education at undergraduate level in the areas of electronics and communication. The department also provides support to all other engineering departments for their classes on electronics and communication-based courses.

=== Facilities ===
CURRICULUM LABORATORY

Department has well equipped Labs with Research facilities. Few of those are:

- EM Theory & Antenna Lab
- Advance Communication Lab sponsored by AICTE under MODROB fund.
- Microprocessor & Microcontroller Lab
- DSP Lab
- VLSI Circuits & Systems Lab
- Project Lab
- Computer lab with state of art PCs connected in LAN and high-speed internet connection.

DEPARTMENTAL LIBRARY

The department is equipped with the library with Text books, Reference books, technical magazines, Journals and e-journals.

INNOVATION LAB

Embedded system and IOT lab (Texas Instrument Innovation Lab), Setup by Digital Shark Technology, Bangalore, University Program Partner TI.

=== Student chapter ===
SPIE, BPPIMT

- 2nd largest student chapter of Asia.
- SPIE supports its members financially and technically.
- Student Chapter receives $750 as a grant to organize different activities.
- Students get chance to go abroad to attend conferences.
- Organized various events like Seminar, Conference, Industrial Visit, school awareness program, Technical quiz (Abhigyan), Model Competition etc.

== See also ==
- List of institutions of higher education in West Bengal
- Education in India
- Education in West Bengal
