= Institute of Science and Technology, West Bengal =

College in West Bengal, India

Institute of Science & Technology
- Type: Private Engineering College
- Affiliations: Maulana Abul Kalam Azad University of Technology, WBSCTE, AICTE
- Chairman: Pravas Ghosh
- Director: Pradip Ghosh
- Location: Dhurabila, Dhamkuria, Chandrakona, Midnapore (W), West Bengal, 721201, India; 22.729331°N 87.4973553°E
- Campus: Urban
- Website: http://istonline.org.in
- Location within West Bengal Location within India

Institute of Science & Technology (informally IST CK Town, IST CKT or simply IST) is a Private engineering and management oriented institute of higher education located in West Bengal, India. It is an institution recognized by Directorate of Technical Education, West Bengal. It is affiliated with West Bengal University of Technology (Wbut) and West Bengal State Council of Technical and Vocational Education and Skill Development (WBSCT&VE&SD). The institute is also recognised by Government of West Bengal and all its courses are duly approved by All India Council of Technical Education (AICTE).

== Campus ==
Located 18 km away from the Prayag Film City, IST is situated beside the State Highway 4, in the outskirts of Chandrakona Town of West Midnapore district. The campus of the college is spread over 20 acres (81,000 m^{2}) of land. It accommodates an administrative block, academic blocks, training and placement cell, resource center, workshops, laboratories, food court, playgrounds and hostel facilities.

== Academics ==
IST imparts education in various engineering and management disciplines. Undergraduate courses award B.Tech in various engineering and technological fields, while postgraduate courses award M.Tech. The institute also offers diploma studies (Polytechnic) in various engineering fields.

Apart from these, the faculty of technology is also offering Bachelor of Computer Applications (BCA) and Master of Computer Applications (MCA) degree courses. The institute also offers Bachelor of Business Administration (BBA) Bachelor of Hospital Management (BHM) degree courses at the undergraduate level.

=== Admission ===
Admission to the B.Tech courses on the basis of West Bengal Joint Entrance Examination and All India Engineering Entrance Examination (JEE). Admission to other courses are based on criteria decided by the Academic Council of the University. There is a provision for direct admission for a limited number of Non-resident Indian/Foreign National students.

== Culture ==
The college hosts annual events, which include the Teacher's Day & Freshers Program and Annual Sports.

== See also ==
- List of institutions of higher education in West Bengal
- West Bengal University of Technology
- West Bengal State Council of Technical Education
- All India Council of Technical Education
- Education in India
- Universities and colleges in India
