= Hooghly Engineering and Technology College =

College in West Bengal

Coordinates: 22.9003°N 88.3927°E

- Motto: Developing Human Resources
- Established: 2004
- Principal: Prof. (Dr.) B. P. Pattanaik
- Faculty: 70 (approx.)
- Administrative staff: 60 (approx.)
- Students: 1200 (approx.)(changes in every year)
- Location: Hooghly, West Bengal, India
- Website: www.hetc.ac.in

Hooghly Engineering and Technology College (HETC) is a self financed engineering college run by the Hooghly Engineering & Technology College Society, engaged in the promotion of technical education amongst students and the dissemination of scientific knowledge in society. The institute is affiliated with Maulana Abul Kalam Azad University of Technology (formally known as WBUT). It is recognised by the Government of West Bengal and its courses are approved by the All India Council for Technical Education (AICTE).

== Academics ==
Hooghly Engineering and Technology College offers undergraduate programs in engineering disciplines. The college offers B.Tech in Computer Science and Engineering, Electronics and Communication Engineering, Electrical Engineering, Civil Engineering, and Mechanical Engineering.

=== Admission ===
Admission to the B.Tech courses is on the basis of the position secured by the candidate in the West Bengal Joint Entrance Examination And Joint Entrance Examination – Main.

In all courses, 90% of students of approved intake capacity are admitted on the basis of merit position secured by the candidate in West Bengal Joint Entrance Examination. The 10% balance of students are admitted from Joint Entrance Examination – Main as per the norms stipulated by the UGC and the West Bengal.

Diploma holders in any engineering and technical discipline can enter for a degree course in the second year at HETC, through the admission test JELET conducted by Central Selection Committee (CSC).

Among these, some (1 or 2) seats are also available for Reserved Category, Tuition Fee Waiver (TFW) and PwD candidates.

== Campus ==
HETC is in Hooghly of Hooghly District in West Bengal, India. It is 1.9 km (1.2 mi) from the Hooghly railway station and approximately 800 m (2,600 ft) from Hooghly Ghat railway station. One half of the campus is connected through Wi-Fi. The college consists of an academic and administrative building, a library and a vast area of open land.

=== Hostel ===
There is a hostel for female students inside of the college campus while the hostel for male students is external.

== Training and placement ==
The training and placement cell arranges vacational training and placement for students at organizations like Indian Air Force, L&T, VECC, Air India, Doordarshan, BSNL, DRDO, WBPDCL, WBSEDCL, Eastern Railways (India), NTPC, DVC, CLW, Simplex, Bridge & Roof, KMDA, Shapoorji Pallonji Group, Gannon Dunkerley & Company, TCS, mPockket., West Bengal State Electricity Transmission Company (WBSETCL), Maulana Abul Kalam Azad University of Technology, Tatia Topi Engineering Works, West Bengal State Council of School Education and IBM.
