= Meghnad Saha Institute of Technology =

Private college in India

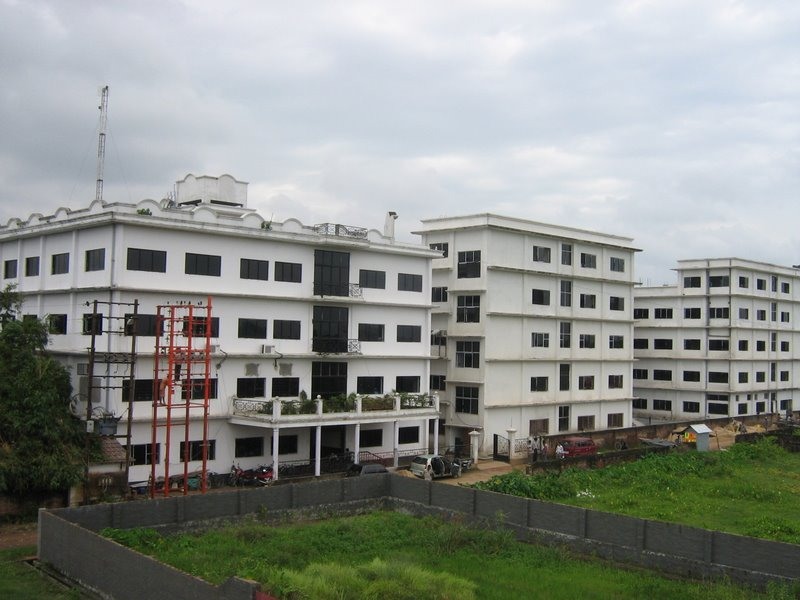
- Type: Private
- Established: 5 September 2001
- Affiliations: Maulana Abul Kalam Azad University of Technology, AICTE
- Undergraduates: 2000
- Postgraduates: 70
- Location: Rajpur Sonarpur, West Bengal, 700150, India; 22.511444°N 88.413258°E
- Campus: Urban
- Website: Official website

- Location within West Bengal Location within India

Meghnad Saha Institute of Technology is an engineering and technology Institute located in West Bengal, India. The college is located in the eastern suburb of the city at Nazirabad, Rajpur Sonarpur. The college is approved by the AICTE and the Directorate of Technical Education, and is affiliated with Maulana Abul Kalam Azad University of Technology.

== Academics ==
=== Admission ===
The institute has a student population mainly from eastern and north-eastern India. Students are admitted into undergraduate B.Tech. course in July and August, based on their performances in WBJEE. Admission into B.Tech. course in MSIT is competitive and requires good rank in WBJEE. Polytechnic students are admitted into B.Tech. second-year first-semester directly, as lateral candidates, based on their scores in JELET examination. MBA students are admitted through Management Aptitude Test (MAT).

=== Academic programmes ===
Undergraduate

- Computer Science & Engineering (B.Tech)
- Computer Science & Business Systems (B.Tech)
- Information Technology (B.Tech.)
- Electronics & Communication Engineering (B.Tech.)
- Electrical Engineering(B.Tech.)
- Civil Engineering (B.Tech.)
- Mechanical Engineering (B.Tech.)
- Bachelor of Computer Applications (BCA)
- Bachelor of Business Administration (BBA)

Post-graduate

- M.Tech (Computer Science, Geo-Technical Engineering (Civil))
- MCA
- MBA

=== Library ===
Until 2009, the institute's library hall was situated at the ground floor of the main academic building. It was fully computerized and had around 28000 volume of books. In addition, it had many printed journals, magazines, a good collection of CDs etc. Now the library is situated over the first floor of the new building with separate reading areas, newspaper kiosk, facilities for viewing on-line journals along with more books and printed materials than before.

=== Ranking ===
The department of Electronics and Communication Engineering of MSIT has been ranked within the top 100 Indian Engineering Colleges in the year 2012, by Silicon India.

In 2013, MSIT ranked 18th nationally in a non IIT Indian Tech-school ranking.

=== People and infrastructure ===
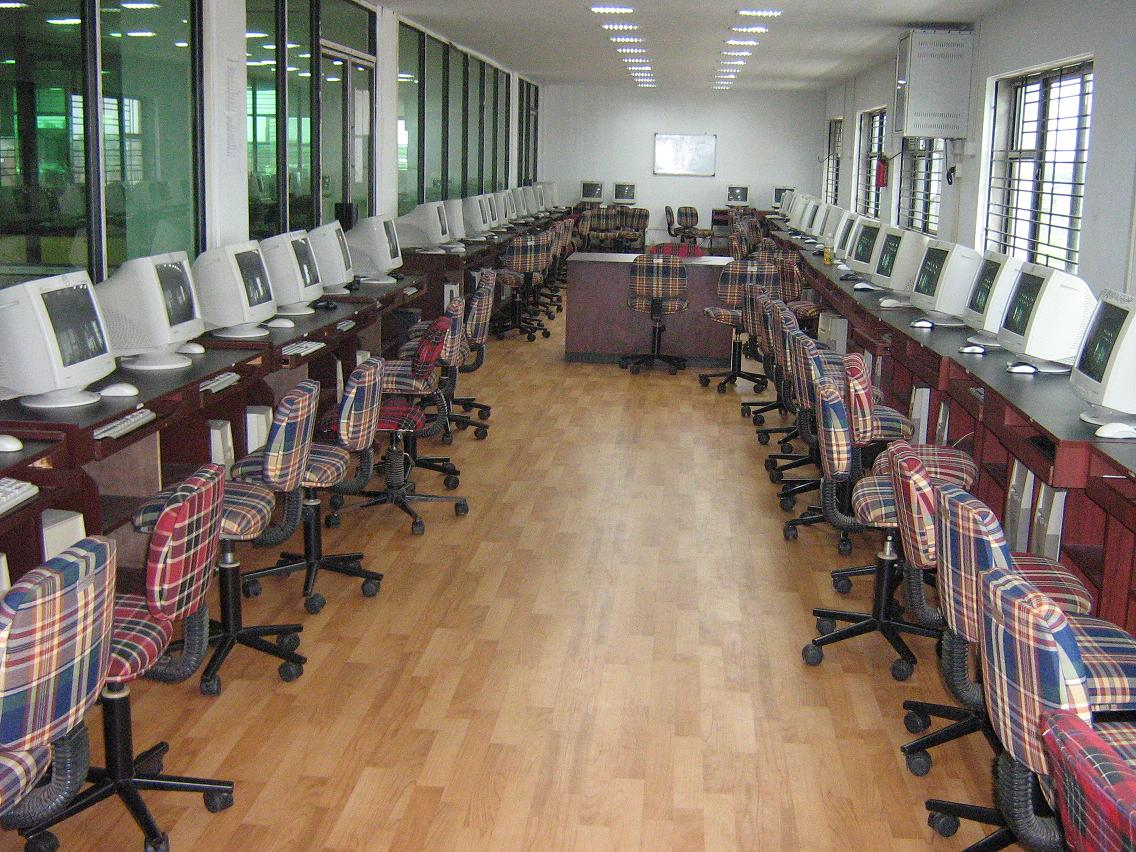
LAB 6 in the Center for Computation

Most of the faculties in the institute are engaged in research inside or outside the institute.

== Research ==
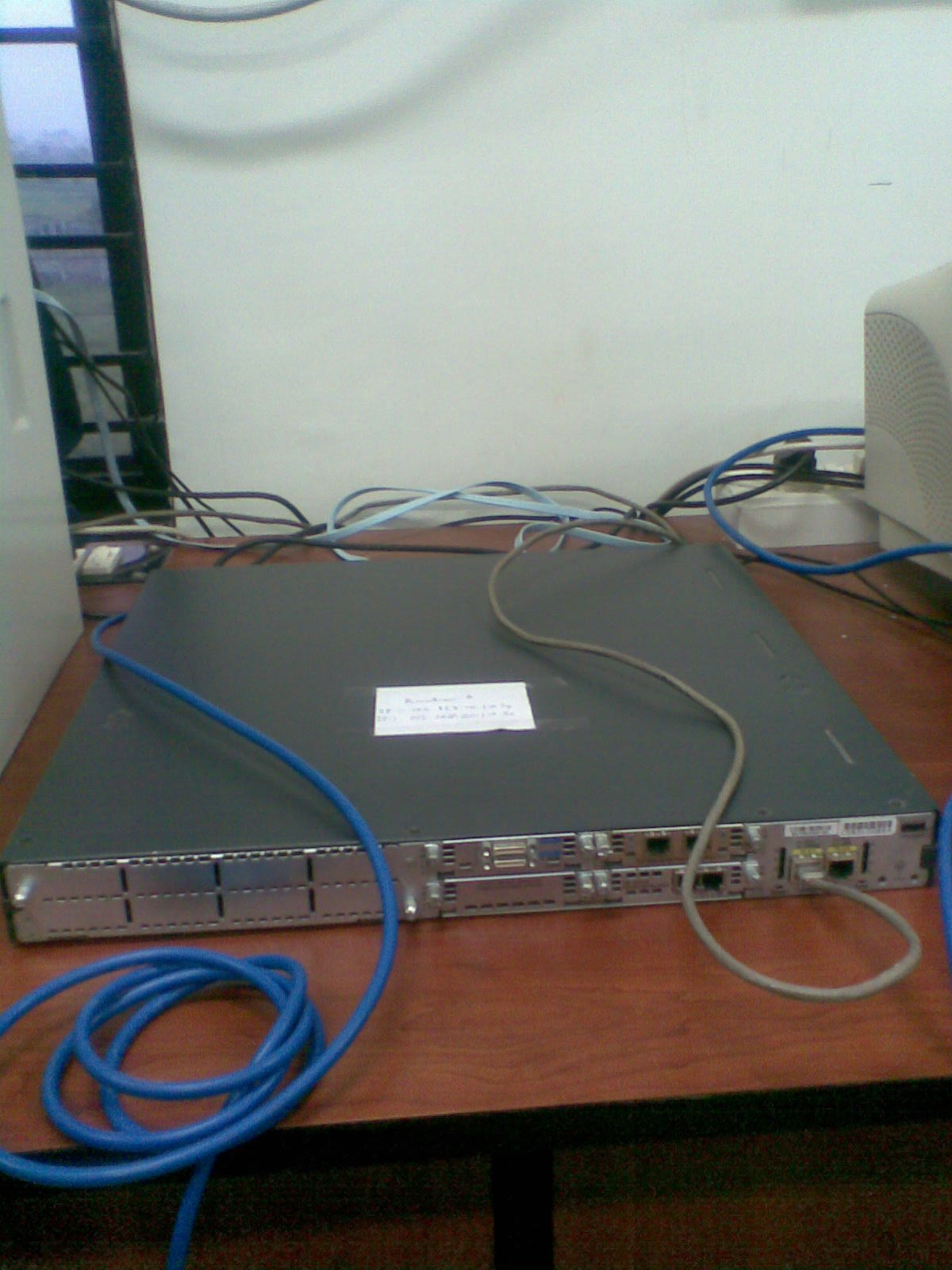
CISCO generic router in Data-Communication Research Hub

A major boost in MSIT's research platform came with a DRDO project on image processing in 2005. The project was hosted in this institute for more than two years and was carried out jointly by faculties and students from ECE and CSE/IT departments. The main research groups in this institute are - the Data Communication research group, the VLSI group.

The Data Communication Research hub, constructed in 2008, is equipped with routers, switches, wireless access points, etc., hardware and software including some indigenous protocol simulation tools, Packet Tracer, etc. The first director of the Communication Hub was Prof. Debasish Datta, the then Head of E&EC department, IIT Kharagpur. Under his supervision some faculties and some students gifted the institute a research lab with its own course material and some indigenous protocol simulators. A number of times the lab has been used by researchers and professors from other institutes for its uniqueness. Research teams, composed of third and fourth year students and guide Professors, still work in the lab. Papers on Mobile Communication have been authored by researchers of this lab which have been published in national and international journals.

The VLSI group, working in the Advanced VLSI Design Lab, in the department of Electronics and Communication Engineering has published more than 50 research papers in international journals/conferences. Professors working in this lab have written books. The group mainly works on CMOS ultra low power designs, CNT etc.

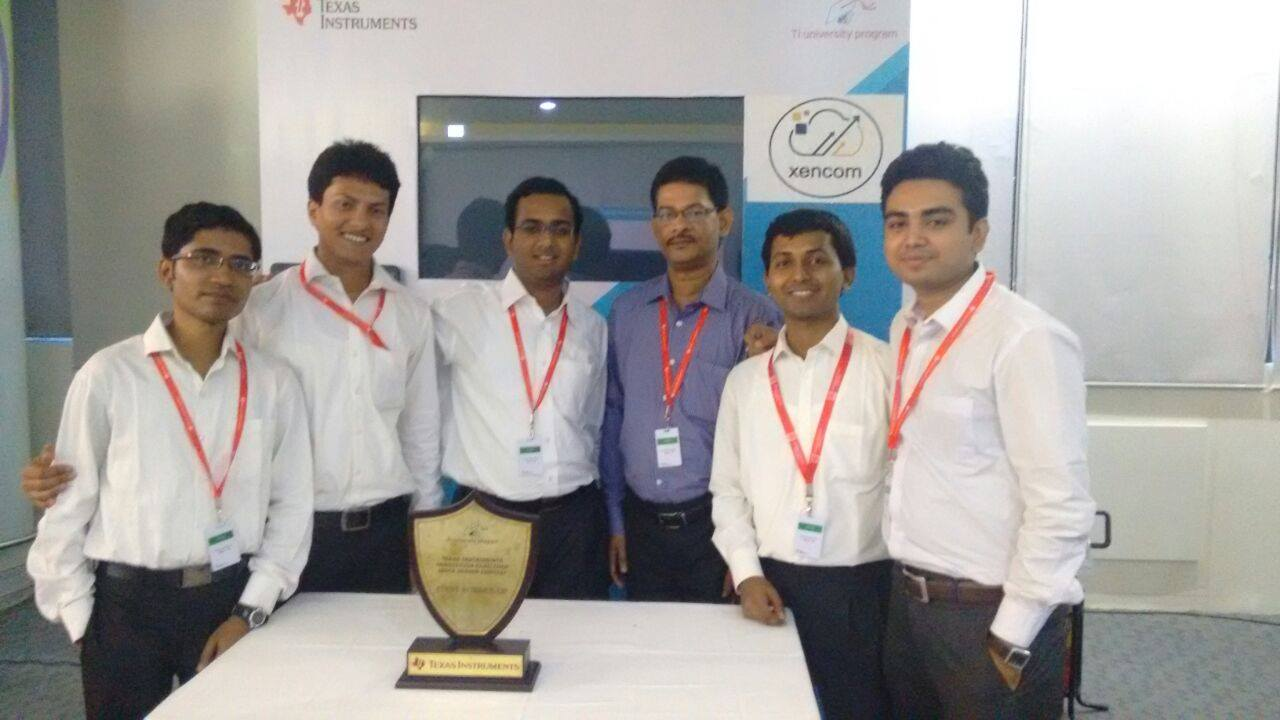
ECE design team (Xencom) at Texas Instruments India Innovation Challenge, 2015

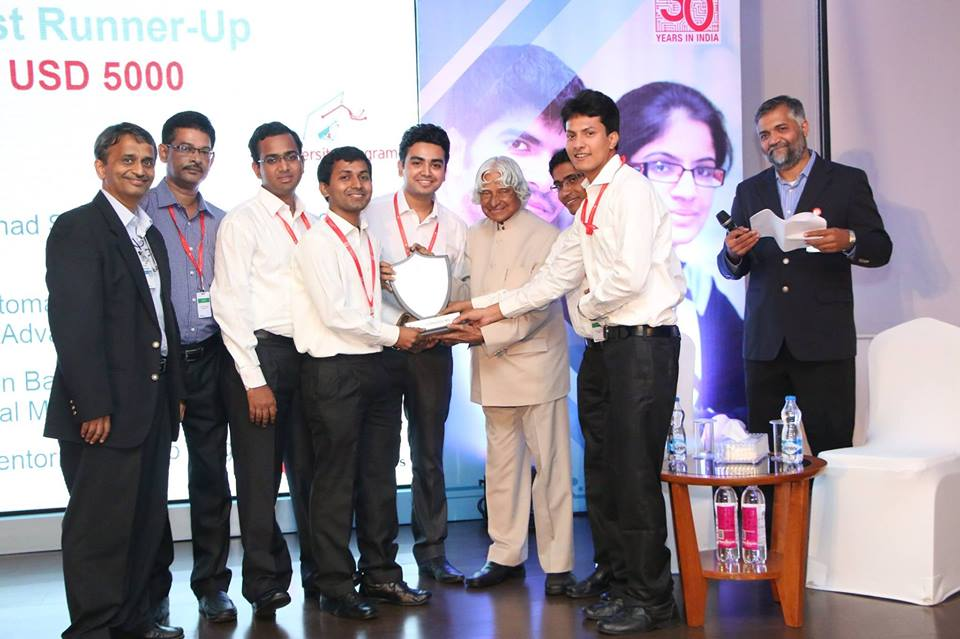
ECE design team (Xencom) receiving runner-up award from Dr. APJ Abdul Kalam

Design teams from the dept. of ECE has participated in many prestigious design competitions and brought accolades. A team from the VLSI group, led by Prof. Manash Chanda of dept. of Electronics and Communication, ranked within top five positions in an electronic design contest organised by Cadence in 2010, and took part in the Symposium organised at Noida. In 2015, the design of an automatic intelligent Irrigation system of ECE department's design team 'Xencom', led by Prof. Sudip Dogra, won the runner-up prize at Texas Instruments India Innovation Challenge 2015, organised by Texas Instruments. A startup named 'Xencom Automation', based on this innovation, is in the process of launching.

There is a student branch of IEEE in MSIT.

== See also ==
- List of institutions of higher education in West Bengal
- Education in West Bengal
