= Government College of Engineering and Ceramic Technology =

Engineering college in Kolkata, India

Coordinates: 22.5651°N 88.3922°E

- Former names: College of Ceramic Technology
- Type: Public Engineering College
- Established: 1941; 85 years ago
- Accreditation: AICTE; NAAC
- Affiliations: MAKAUT
- Academic affiliations: MAKAUT; AICTE; Upgraded autonomous Postgraduate institute by UGC for UG and PG Department
- Chairman: Prof. Binay K. Dutta
- Principal: Krishnendu Chakraborty
- Dean: Jayanta Choudhury
- Academic staff: 43
- Administrative staff: 17
- Students: 648
- Undergraduates: 576
- Postgraduates: 72
- Location: 73, Abhinash Chandra Bannerjee Lane, Beliaghata, Kolkata, West Bengal, India
- Language: English, Bengali
- Website: gcect.ac.in

The Government College of Engineering and Ceramic Technology, formerly known as College of Ceramic Technology (CCT), is a public college affiliated to the Maulana Abul Kalam Azad University of Technology in Kolkata, India. The college offers B.Tech and M.Tech in Ceramic Technology, Information Technology and Computer Science and Engineering. The college has recently stepped into its 75th year of existence. The Platinum Jubilee of the college was celebrated in April 2016 with association of international conferences, an alumni meet and visit of eminent peoples.

== Graduation ==
The college offers B.Tech in Ceramic Technology, Information Technology and Computer Science and Engineering. There is an intake capacity of 48 students (40 through WBJEE and 8 through JELET respectively) per department. The B.Tech courses of the CSE and IT departments were introduced in 2001 and 2000 respectively. First convocation of GCECT was held on 26 August 2017 at College premises.

== Achievements ==
- NAAC accredited grade A autonomous institution under Maulana Abul Kalam Azad University of Technology.
- The college is an IBM Software Centre of Excellence
- Joint research project with IIT-Kharagpur- the development of jute reinforced concrete
- Joint industrial project with TISCO- Comparative study of wear mechanism of MgO –Carbon, Al_{2}O_{3}-MgO-Carbon and Pitch bonded Dolomite Refractories in Steel Ladle Working Environment

== Festivals ==
Techtronics Logo from 2009

KarmaTek (formerly Techtronics) and Jagriti are the technical and cultural festivals respectively, that the college students conduct annually.
