= Cooch Behar Government Engineering College =

Engineering college in West Bengal

Cooch Behar Government Engineering College (CGEC)
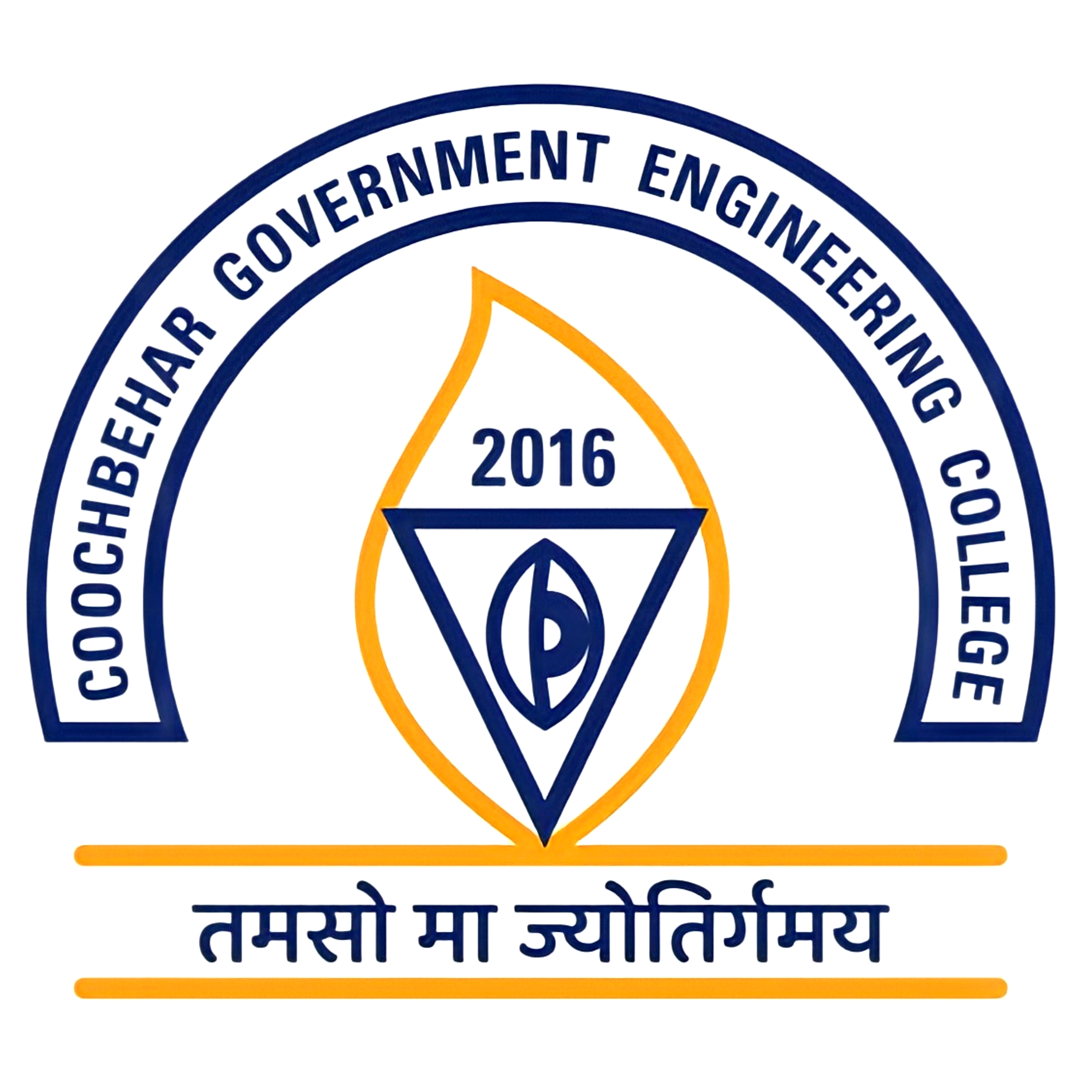
- Motto: तमसो मा ज्योतिर्गमय (Sanskrit)
- Motto in English: From darkness, lead me to enlightenment
- Type: Public Engineering College
- Established: 16 August 2016; 9 years ago
- Founder: Government of West Bengal
- Accreditation: All India Council for Technical Education
- Academic affiliations: MAKAUT; AICTE
- Location: Cooch Behar, West Bengal, India; 26°17′35.97″N 89°27′28.64″E
- Campus: Rural 21 acres (0.085 km^{2})
- Language: English, Bengali
- Website: cgec.org.in

Cooch Behar Government Engineering College (CGEC) is a government engineering college in Cooch Behar district, West Bengal, India. It is approved by the All India Council for Technical Education (AICTE) and affiliated to Maulana Abul Kalam Azad University of Technology, as well as the Department of Higher Education, Government of West Bengal. The institute is housed in a 21-acre campus.

== Admission ==
1. WBJEE (West Bengal Joint Entrance Examination) conducted by West Bengal Joint Entrance Board for admission in Bachelor of Technology (B.Tech.)
2. JELET (Joint Entrance Examination for Lateral Entry) conducted by West Bengal Joint Entrance Board for admission in lateral entry in 2nd year (3rd semester) of the four-year course of bachelor's degree in technology.

== Courses offered ==
Cooch Behar Government Engineering College offers five Undergraduate courses (Bachelor of Technology) in the following courses:

- B.Tech in Civil Engineering
- B.Tech in Mechanical Engineering
- B.Tech in Computer Science and Engineering
- B.Tech in Electronics and Telecommunication Engineering
- B.Tech in Electrical Engineering

It is affiliated to Maulana Abul Kalam Azad University of Technology.
