= Greater Kolkata College of Engineering and Management =

College in West Bengal

Coordinates: 22°20′45.10″N 88°27′41.81″E

- Motto: सा विद्या या विमुक्तये
- Motto in English: That is knowledge which liberates
- Type: B. Tech and Diploma Engineering College
- Established: 2008
- Affiliations: Maulana Abul Kalam Azad University of Technology
- Location: Baruipur, West Bengal, India
- Campus: Dudhnai, Ramnagar- II, Baruipur, 24 Parganas (South), Pin: 743387
- Approvals: AICTE; Department of Higher Education, Government of West Bengal
- Website: gkcem.ac.in

Greater Kolkata College of Engineering and Management, Baruipur, (GKCEM Baruipur, GKCEMB) is a self-financed institute in the state of West Bengal. Greater Kolkata College of Engineering and Management is ranked one of the best engineering colleges in Eastern India. The campus is situated on the southern fringes of Kolkata. It is affiliated with Maulana Abul Kalam Azad University of Technology Kolkata.

== History ==
Greater Kolkata College of Engineering and Management was set up on the southern part of Kolkata in 2008 by a group of education activists hailing from the flourishing information technology, electronics, and related industries around Kolkata. The foundation behind the growth of GKCEM is JIS Group. To meet the demand for technical manpower and in view of fiscal constraints at the governmental level, JIS Group supplemented the state government's efforts in setting up new engineering colleges by establishing a college at Asansol in August 1998.

== Departments in Faculty of Engineering and Technology ==
The institute offers one undergraduate course (B.Tech.) and one diploma course. All courses are approved by the All India Council for Technical Education AICTE, Government of India, and the Department of Higher Education, Government of West Bengal. Since its inception, it has been affiliated to the West Bengal University of Technology, Kolkata.

The institute offers undergraduate B.Tech.& Diploma course in the following engineering disciplines:

- Civil Engineering
- Computer Science and Engineering
- Electrical Engineering
- Electronics and Communication Engineering
- Mechanical Engineering

Under Graduate Program

- BBA & BCA

=== Facilities and infrastructure ===
- Sports Facilities
- Fire Safety
- Transportation
- Cafeteria
- Student Accommodation
