= Heritage Institute of Technology, Kolkata =

Engineering College in Anandapur, Kolkata, India

Heritage Institute of Technology
- হেরিটেজ ইনস্টিটিউট অফ টেকনোলজি
- Motto: Atmo Deepo Bhavo
- Motto in English: Be Your Own Light
- Type: Private, Autonomous
- Established: 2001; 25 years ago
- Affiliations: UGC, AICTE
- Academic affiliations: Maulana Abul Kalam Azad University of Technology
- Principal: Basab Chowdhury
- Director: Probir Roy
- Students: 2,396
- Undergraduates: 2,328
- Postgraduates: 68
- Location: Kolkata, West Bengal, India; 22°31′6.72″N 88°24′58.85″E
- Campus: Urban (10 acre)
- Website: heritageit.edu

Heritage Institute of Technology (HITK) is a private educational institute in the south of Kolkata, West Bengal, India. It is affiliated with Maulana Abul Kalam Azad University of Technology. It became an autonomous college from the University Grants Commission in 2017. According to the 2022 National Institutional Ranking Framework for Engineering, the college ranked in the 201-250 rank band.

== History ==
HITK was established on the eastern fringes of Kolkata in September 2000 by a group of industrialists from the information technology, electronics, and related industries around Kolkata, and other public figures, organised as the Kalyan Bharti Trust.

== Academics ==
The institute offers one undergraduate course (B. Tech.) and three graduate courses (M. Tech., MBA, and MCA). All courses are approved by the All India Council for Technical Education AICTE, Government of India, and the Department of Higher Education, Government of West Bengal. Since its inception, it has been affiliated to the West Bengal University of Technology, Kolkata.

== Fests and Freshers ==
Prior to the pandemic era, the Institute constituted a Students' Council, vesting in students the autonomy to spearhead flagship events and contribute substantively to deliberations concerning student welfare. The Students' Council curated the institute’s freshers’ gathering, Nascent, as well as some of the most prominent cultural spectacles in West Bengal—namely, Eclecia, and the technical conclave, Dakshh. The roster of Eclecia’s headlining acts from 2005 through 2017 is chronicled below:

1. Eclecia 2005: Parikrama
2. Eclecia 2006: Indian Ocean
3. Eclecia 2007: Insomnia
4. Eclecia 2008: Euphoria
5. Eclecia 2009: Bickram Ghosh’s Rhythmscape, Breathe (Pink Floyd tribute band)
6. Eclecia 2010: Suraj Jagan
7. Eclecia 2011: Cactus, Kunal Ganjawala
8. Eclecia 2012: Somlata and the Aces, DJ Hardik, Noiseware, Benny Dayal
9. Eclecia 2013: Neeraj Shridhar (Bombay Vikings)
10. Eclecia 2014: KK, DJ Harish, Spunk, Chrome, Calcutta Blues
11. Eclecia 2015: Mohit Chauhan
12. Eclecia 2016: Sunidhi Chauhan, Satyajeet Jha
13. Eclecia 2017: Farhan Akhtar, Fossils

In 2019, the Institute attempted to stage its independent festival in lieu of Eclecia—Heritage Utsav, headlined by Monali Thakur; however, the event was marred by torrential rain, which disrupted the scheduled performance and diminished attendance.

Since 2019, the Institute has refrained from hosting any large-scale cultural or technical festivals. Notably, after the last Students’ Council was convened in 2020, the organizers revived Nascent—the first iteration since 2017—and outlined an ambitious relaunch of Eclecia and Dakshh. Regrettably, these plans were curtailed as the onset of the Covid-19 pandemic suspended all proceedings.

In 2022, following the easing of pandemic-related restrictions, the Institute endeavored once again to conduct Nascent, Eclecia, and Dakshh by constituting a dedicated Steering Committee. This body comprised coordinators representing the 17 principal student clubs. Despite the initiative, internal conflicts within the student community remained unresolved by management, ultimately thwarting the festivals’ execution.

In 2024, the college pivoted towards more contained inter-college engagements, collaborating with its cultural collectives—Anubhav, Ghungroo, Pravasana, Resonance. Each club curated and hosted its own standalone event within the campus auditoriums across staggered dates

== Campus ==
The 10-acre campus also houses other institutes that come under the Heritage Group: Heritage Law College, Heritage College, Heritage School, Heritage Academy, and Heritage Business School.

== Student exchange ==
The institute signed an MoU with the New Jersey Institute of Technology (NJIT) for a student exchange programme, open to second and third year students with the highest CGPA from each department.

It has also signed a memorandum of understanding (MoU) with the College of Natural Science, Sungkyunkwan University, and with IIT Guwahati.
