= Alipurduar Government Engineering and Management College =

Engineering college

Alipurduar Government Engineering and Management College (AGEMC)
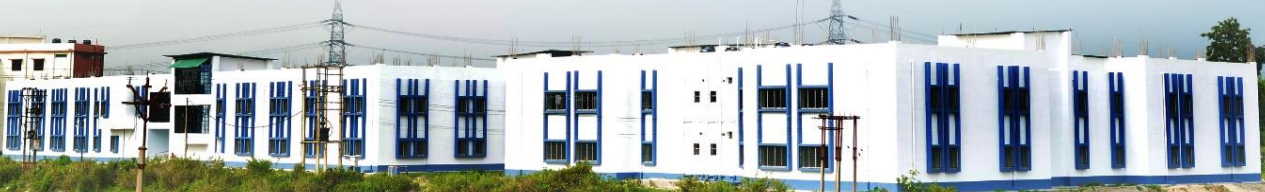
- Other names: Alipurduar Engineering College
- Type: Public Engineering college
- Established: 2023 (3 years ago)
- Founders: Government of West Bengal
- Accreditation: All India Council for Technical Education
- Affiliations: WBUT
- Academic affiliations: MAKAUT; AICTE
- Budget: ₹55.30 crore (US$5.8 million) (FY2022–23 est.)
- Principal: Dr. Sourish Sanyal (in charge)
- Students: 540+ (2025)
- Location: Chhipra, Kamakhyaguri, Alipurduar, West Bengal, 736206, India; 26.4965415°N 89.6982676°E
- Campus: Remote Town 18.45 acres (7.47 ha)
- Language: English, Bengali
- Colors
- Nickname: AGEMCians
- Website: agemc.ac.in

Alipurduar Government Engineering and Management College is a Public Engineering college in Kamakhyaguri, Alipurduar, West Bengal. It was established in 2023 by the Government of West Bengal, which is the first engineering college in Alipurduar district. The institution is regulated, operated and administered by the Government of West Bengal. Nearest town is Uttar Kamakhyaguri

It is a four-year undergraduate institution, which enrolls 180 students each year. It offers 4 undergraduate (B.Tech.) engineering degree courses affiliated to the Maulana Abul Kalam Azad University of Technology.

== History ==
The construction of the infrastructure on the college campus started in 2018, and the construction of the primary infrastructure was completed in 2023. A fund of Rs.55.30 crore was provided for the construction work. The college received approval from All India Council for Technical Education in 2023. Classes started in the college from the academic year 2023–24.

== Campus ==
Alipurduar's 18.45 acres (7.47 ha) campus is in Chhipra, a village 19 kilometres (12 mi) east of Alipurduar city, and 6.8 km west of Uttar Kamakhyaguri . It is directly west of the Raidak river and directly North of the NH 27. The college has an administrative building, an academic building and three hostel buildings Queen – two for boys and one for girls. The academic building spread across of 3,447 square feet and the administrative building spread across of 1,667 square feet. The three hostel buildings can accommodate 480 students.

== Organization and administration ==
Departments of AGMEC

- Computer Science & Engineering
- Artificial Intelligence
- Electronics and Communication Engineering
- Electrical Engineering

== Academics and programs ==
Alipurduar Government Engineering and Management College(AGEMC) offers instruction in the engineering and management disciplines and awards the Bachelor of Technology degree. The college offers 4 undergraduate (B.Tech.) engineering degree courses: Artificial intelligence, Computer Science and engineering, Electrical engineering, and Electronics and Communication engineering.
