= Calcutta Institute of Engineering and Management =

Engineering College in West Bengal, India

Coordinates: 22.4844°N 88.345°E

Calcutta Institute of Engineering and Management (CIEM)
- Other name: CIEM
- Type: Self-Financing Govt. Aided college
- Established: 2003; 23 years ago
- Affiliations: Maulana Abul Kalam Azad University of Technology (MAKAUT) of
- Undergraduates: 1500 (approx)
- Location: 24, 1A, Chandi Ghosh Rd, Ashok Nagar, Tollygunge, Kolkata, West Bengal, 700040, India
- Campus: Indian
- Approvals: AICTE
- Website: ciem.ac.in
- Location in Kolkata Location in India

The Calcutta Institute of Engineering and Management or CIEM alongside Calcutta Institute of Science and Management or CISM is a government college in West Bengal, India, offering undergraduate and postgraduate courses in Engineering and Technology and other allied fields.

The college is affiliated with Maulana Abul Kalam Azad University of Technology and all the relevant programs are approved by the All India Council for Technical Education.

Tollygunge.[3]

== Academics ==
The institute was established in 2003 and offers eight undergraduate courses:

- B.Tech. in Electronics and Communication Engineering (ECE)- 4 years [Approved intake - 60]
- B.Tech. in Electrical Engineering (EE)- 4 years [Approved intake - 30]
- B.Tech. in Civil Engineering (CE)- 4 years [Approved intake - 30]
- B.Tech. in Computer Science and Engineering (CSE)- 4 years [Approved intake - 60]
- B.Tech. in Information Technology Engineering (IT)- 4 years [Approved intake - 60]
- Bachelor in Business Administration (BBA)- 3 years [Approved intake - 60]
- Bachelor in Business Administration (BBA Business Analytics)- 3 years [Approved intake - 30]
- Bachelor of Computer Application (BCA)- 3 years [Approved intake - 60]
- Bachelor's in Data Science- 4 years [approved intake - 30]

A lone post-graduate course is offered: Master in Business Administration- 2 years [Approved intake - 60]

== See also ==
- List of institutions of higher education in West Bengal
- Education in India
- Education in West Bengal
