= Government College of Engineering & Textile Technology, Berhampore =

Public engineering college in Berhampore, Murshidabad, West Bengal

Coordinates: 24°05′47.39″N 88°15′02.13″E

- Former name: College of Textile Technology
- Type: Public Engineering College
- Established: 1927; 99 years ago
- Academic affiliations: MAKAUT
- Principal: Anindya Ghosh (Officer-In-Charge)
- Undergraduates: 665
- Postgraduates: 36
- Location: 4, Cantonment Road, Berhampore, Murshidabad, West Bengal, India
- Website: www.gcettb.ac.in

The Government College of Engineering & Textile Technology Berhampore (formerly known as the College of Textile Technology Berhampore) is a college of Maulana Abul Kalam Azad University of Technology in Berhampore, West Bengal, India. It is a residential and co-educational institute. Admission for undergraduate students is through the West Bengal Joint Entrance Examination. This college is selected for TEQIP (Technical Education Quality Improvement Programme), Phase II.

== History ==
The college was established in the central jail premises at Berhampore on 18th July 1927 as the Government Silk Weaving and Dyeing Institute to train local artisans engaged in silk production and silk weaving in Murshidabad district under the administrative control of the Directorate of Industries, Government of West Bengal.

The institute was moved to its present location at 4 Barrack Square (East) during 1932–33. The college was upgraded in 1940 and renamed Bengal Technological Institute with the introduction of a 3-year diploma course (licentiate) in Textile Technology and a 2-year artisan course. Given the general nature of the course, the college was renamed the Berhampore Textile Institute in 1950.

In 1958 the college was upgraded to the level of a degree college with the modernisation of the syllabus, workshop and laboratories. A three-year B.Sc. (Tech.) degree course in Textile Technology affiliated to the University of Calcutta was introduced and the name changed again to College of Textile Technology. In 1963, a four-year B.Sc. (Tech.) degree course was started. The college was subsequently brought under the administrative control of the Directorate of Technical Education in 1972.

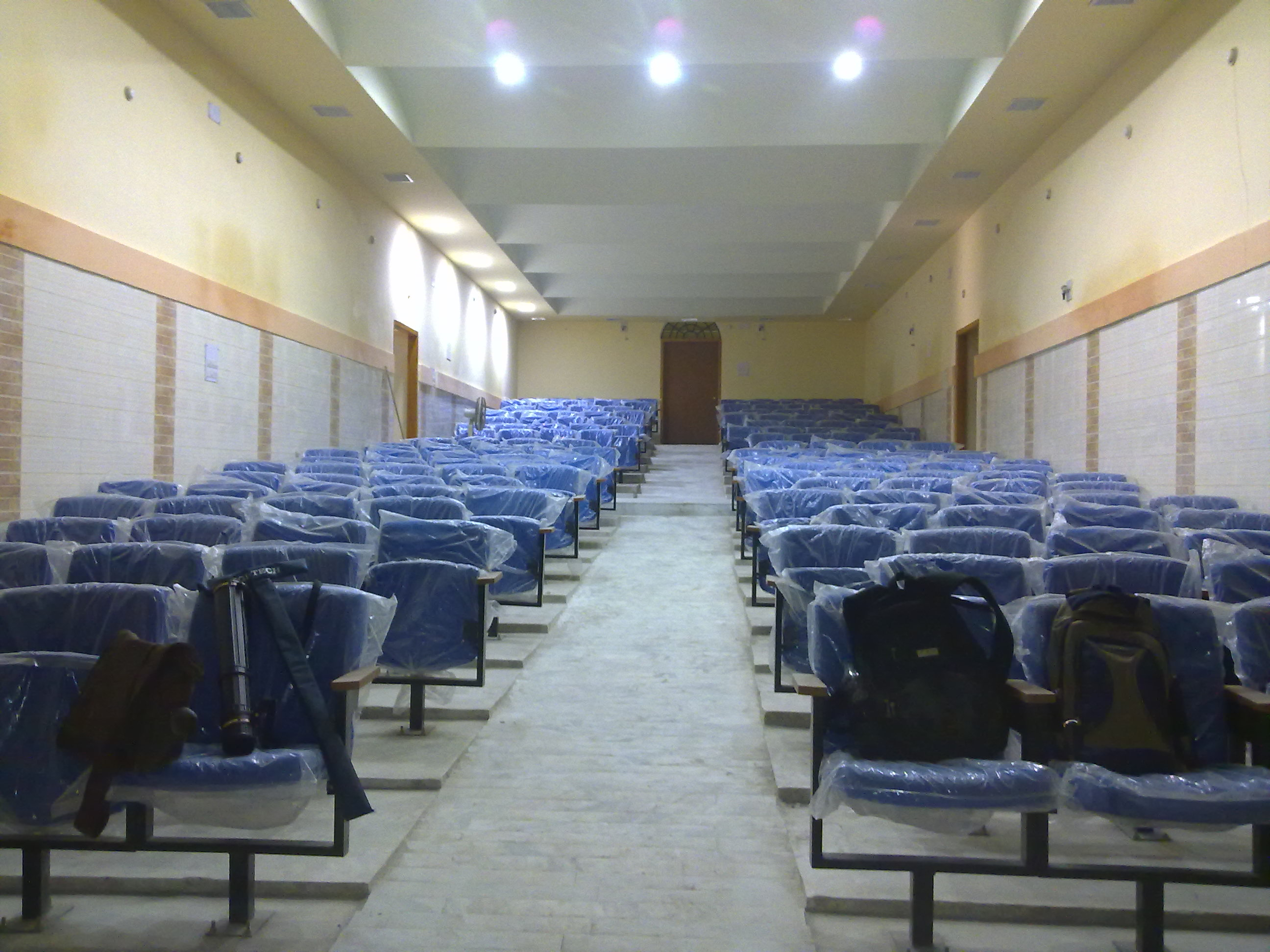
Audi GCETTB

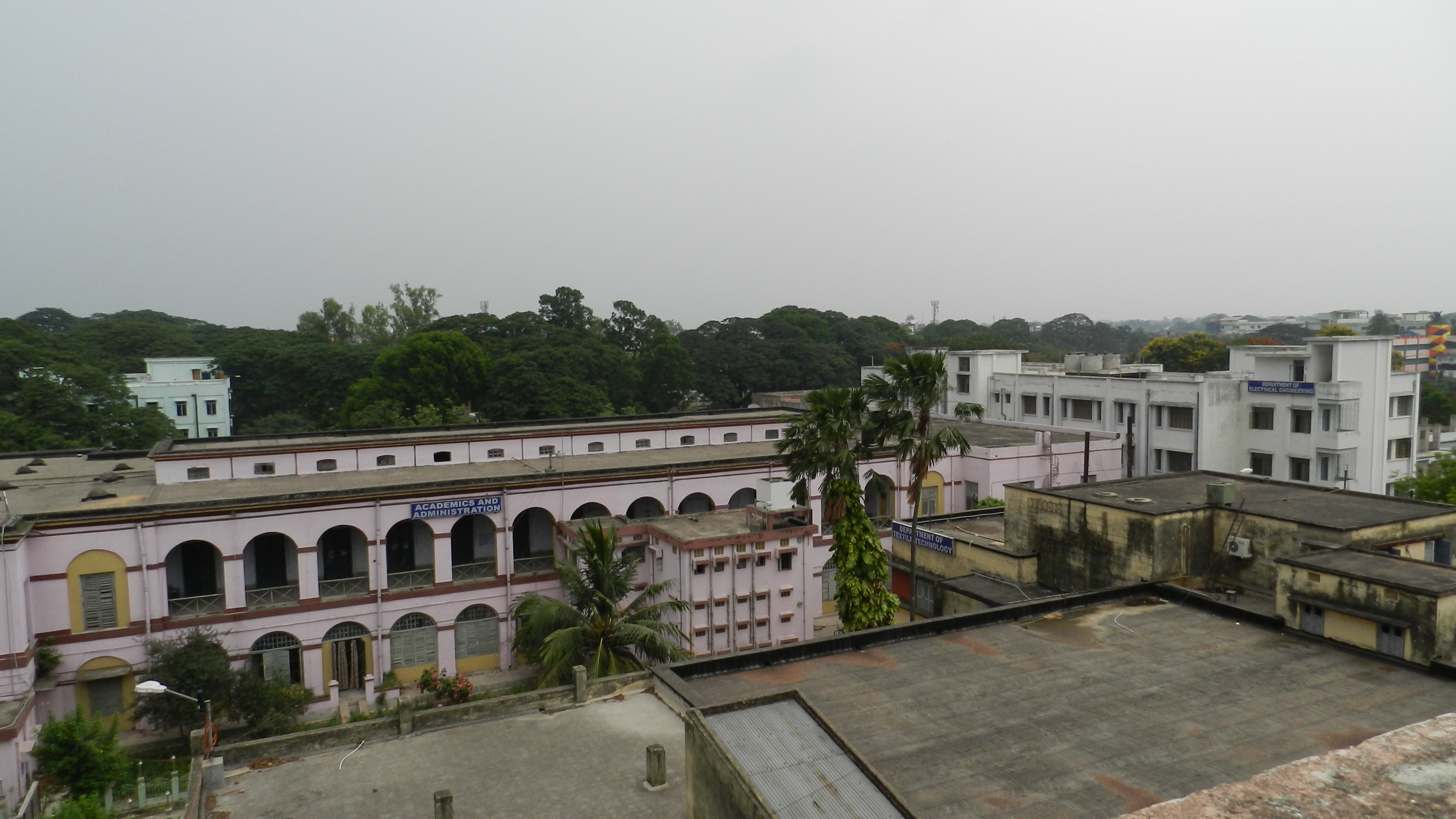
Aerial view

In 1990, the college was transferred to the University of Kalyani. The B.Sc. (Tech.) the degree was changed to a B.Tech. in 1998 in line with AICTE's wish to bring parity with other engineering degrees in India.

The college was brought under the academic control of the West Bengal University of Technology in 2001. In the same year, a new B. Tech. course in Computer Science and Engineering was introduced. In 2002, the college was once again renamed the Government College of Engineering & Textile Technology, Berhampore.

In 2004, the Textile Technology department of the institute was accredited by the National Board of Accreditation (NBA). Later in the year 2010, two new departments, Mechanical Engineering and Electrical Engineering were introduced.

== Campus ==
Government College of Engineering & Textile Technology, Berhampore is situated in Berhampore, in Murshidabad district of West Bengal.

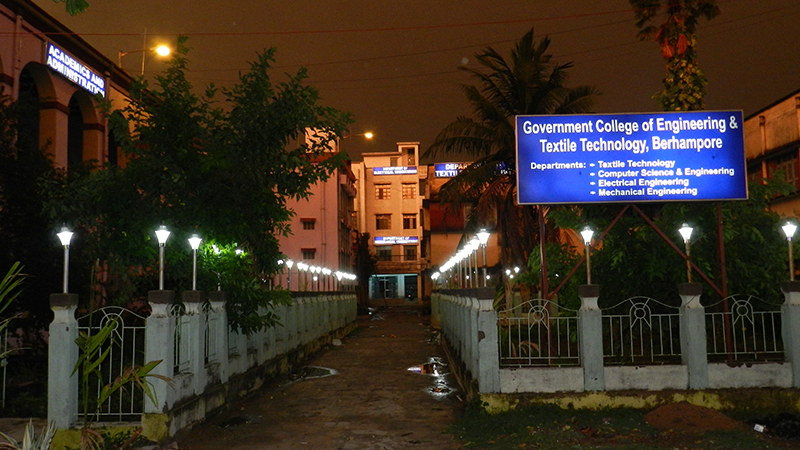
Main gate 15

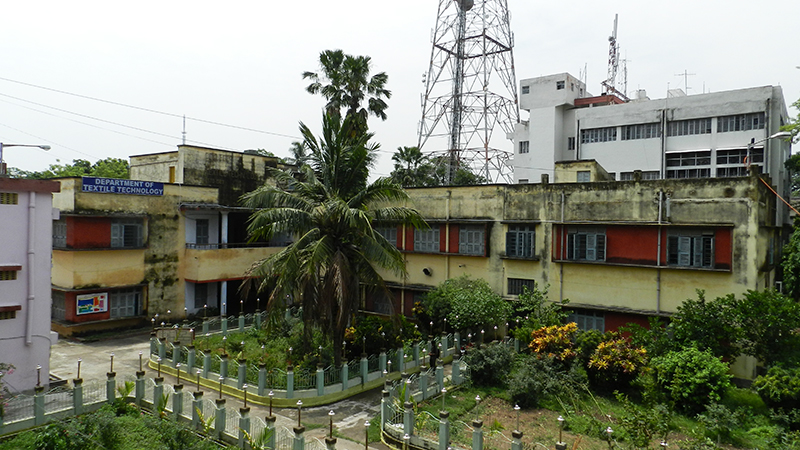
Campus 5

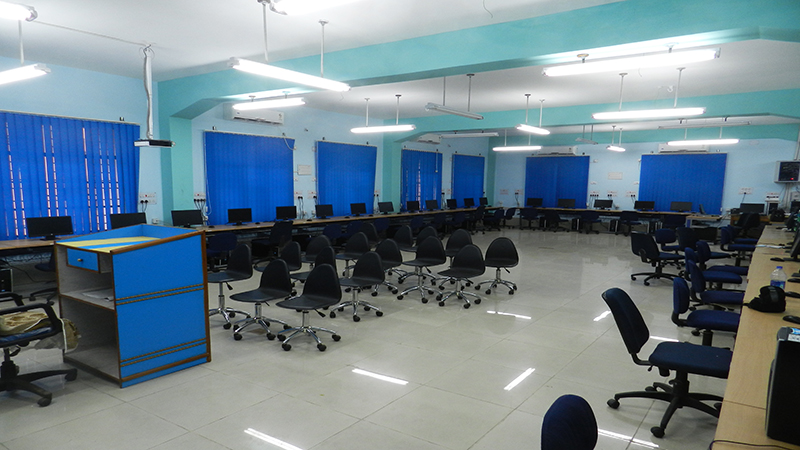
Main Lab 2

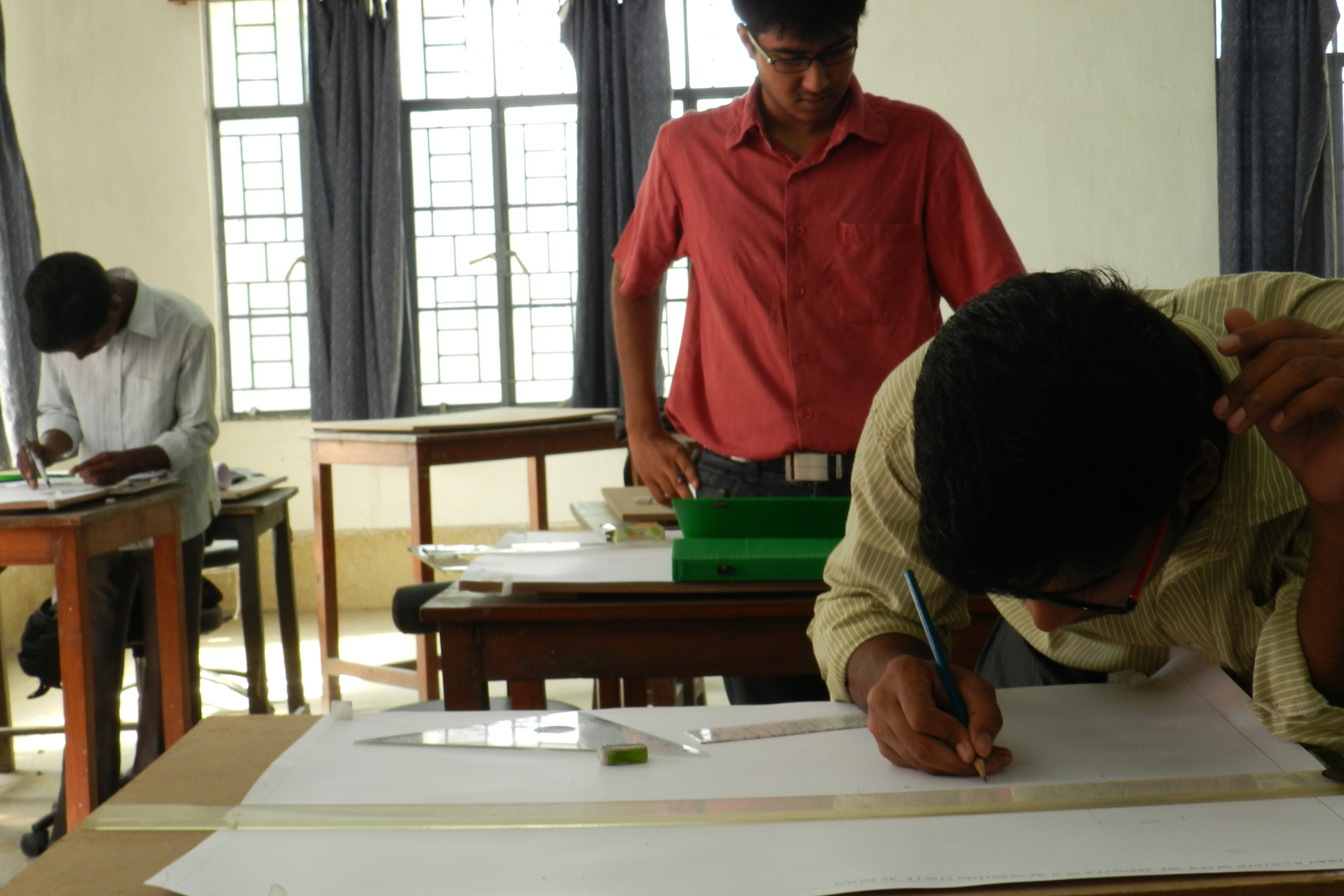
Drawing MECH

== Organisation and administration ==
=== Governance ===
Recognised by the Department of Higher Education, it is under the direct administrative control of the Government of West Bengal.

=== Departments ===
==== Computer Science and Engineering ====
This department was started in 2001 to fill the demand for well-trained human resources for the flourishing computer hardware and software industry. Apart from preparing the students with hard skills special efforts are imparted to develop soft skills like paper presentation, giving technical seminars, mock interviews and other such skills normally considered essential in the industry.

==== Mechanical Engineering ====
Since 2010, this department has offered a 4-year course of study leading to a B. Tech. Degree in Mechanical Engineering. Professors from engineering universities such as Jadavpur University and BESU are attached to the college as guest lecturers. Currently there are a CAD lab, a Mechatronics lab, a Measurement lab, a Fluid Mechanics lab, a Heat transfer lab, an IC engine workshop, and an Applied Mechanics lab. The department has a petrol engine from Maruti Turbines, and a mini-power plant and also a 3D printing machine is installed.

==== Electrical Engineering ====
Since 2010, this department has offered a 4-year course of study leading to a B. Tech. Degree in Electrical Engineering. There are circuit theory labs, state-of-the-art seminar halls, thermal power engineering labs, electrical machines lab, electronics lab, control system lab, etc.

==== Textile Technology ====
This department has been offering an undergraduate course (B.Tech in Textile Technology) since 1958. The department is accredited by the National Board of Accreditation (NBA). In the last eight years the department has received 40.00 lakh rupees for four projects from the All India Council or Technical Education under the MODROBS scheme. At present two MODROBS projects are in progress in the department.

The National Conference on Emerging Trends in Textile, Fibre & Apparel Engineering was held at the college on 18–19 March 2006. Around 150 participants attended.

== Academics ==
=== Affiliation and accreditations ===
- National Board of Accreditation
- All India Council for Technical Education [AICTE]
- University Grants Commission (India) [UGC], Government of India
- Ministry of Human Resource Department, Government of India
- Ministry of Higher Education Dept., Govt. of West Bengal

=== Programs offered ===
B Tech:

- Engineering – Computer Science Engineering – AICTE approved (Intake 47 [1st year including 2 TFW Seats + 1 Defence Quota] + 09 [lateral])
- Engineering – Electrical Engineering – AICTE approved (Intake 32 [1st year including 2 TFW seats] + 06 [lateral])
- Engineering – Mechanical Engineering – AICTE approved (Intake 32 [1st year including 2 TFW seats] + 06 [lateral])
- Engineering – Textile Technology – AICTE approved (Intake 35 [1st year including 2 TFW seats] + 06 [lateral])

M Tech:

- Mechanical Processing of Textiles – AICTE approved

=== Admission ===
Admission in the 1st semester to all UG courses are done by their ranking in West Bengal Joint Entrance Examination, through e-Counselling conducted by WBJEE, held every year. Twenty per cent of the total intake is filled-in from Lateral Entry candidates in the 3rd semester through JELET. M.Tech students are selected through the GATE exam.

=== Training and placement ===
Students of Textile Technology are trained and placed at several companies lincluding Vardhman Textiles Ltd, Mahabir Fabrics, Welspun Ind. Ltd, Amrit Exports Pvt. Ltd, Raymonds Ltd, Reid and Taylor, Nahar Fabrics, Arvind, Jayashree Textiles, Winsome, Trident (Abhishek group of Industries), Bombay rayon Fashions Ltd, Intertek Technical Services, BVCOS, SGS, TUV, Century, Sarla Fabrics, Alok Industries, Ashima Textiles, Soma Textiles, Mudra, Madura Life Style, DC Decore, and BSL Limited.

Students of the CSE department are trained and placed at several companies including Globsyn, Tech Mahindra, CMC Ltd. IBM helpdesk, Oracle, Accenture, Infosys, and Capgemini.

Students of the ME department are trained at several companies including Durgapur Projects Limited, Durgapur Steel Plant, Indian Railways, Bokaro Steel Plant

Students of the EE department are trained at several companies including Indian Railways, Durgapur Projects Limited, Durgapur Steel Plant, NTPC units, WBSEDCL plants, CESC, and WBSETCL.

=== Library ===
The college library offers science and technological books and journals. The total number of books is 12,600 (Textile Technology books: 3,711; Computer Science and Engineering books: 1,800; Other books: 7,079).

A large number of books for Mechanical and Electrical Engineering students were introduced recently.

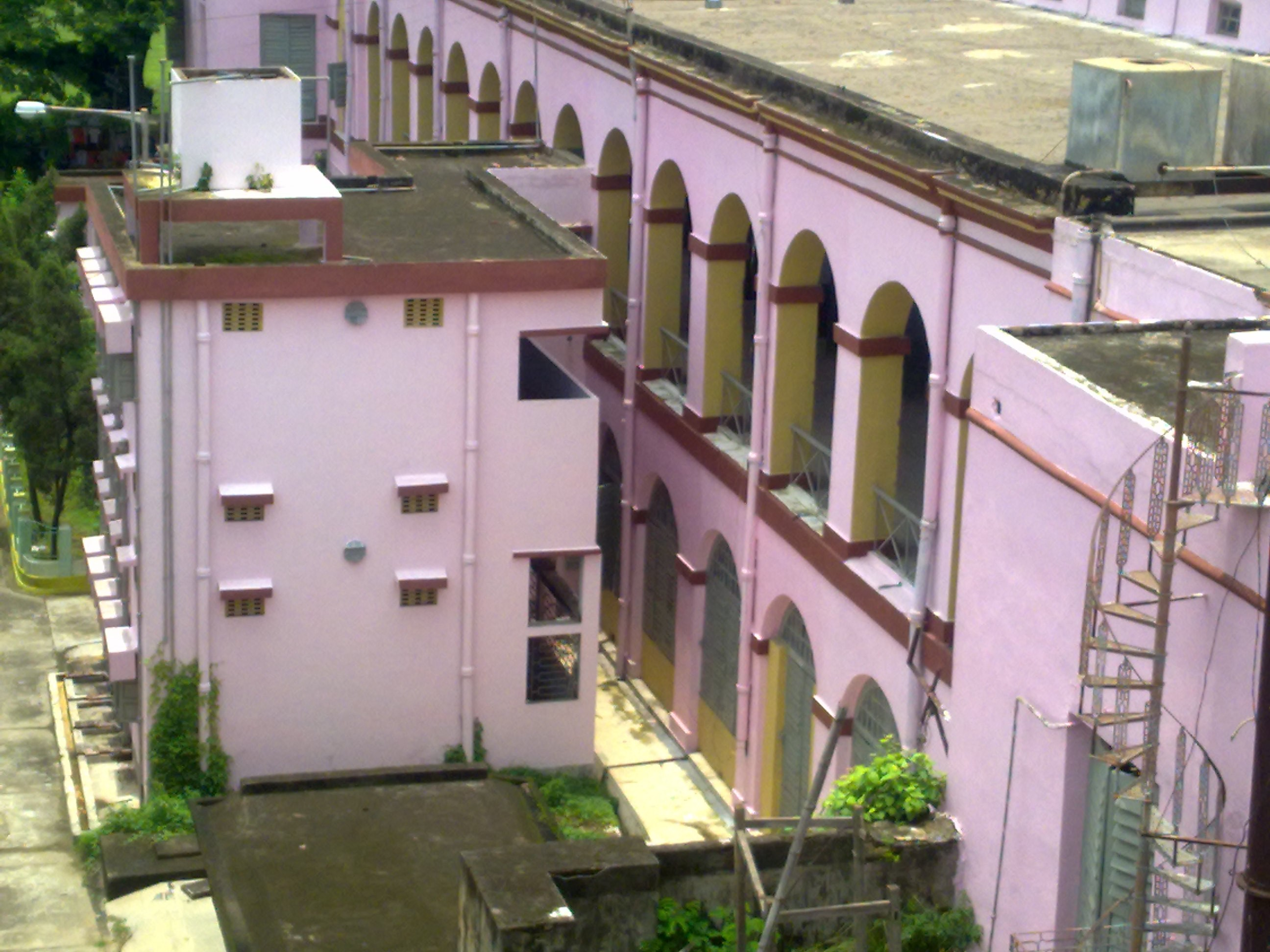

== Student life ==
=== Hostel ===
The college offers a four-storied hostel facility with an intake of 100 students with food and lodging for the boys only. The hostel is having a playground, gymnasium, library and indoor games facilities. The hostel common room is provided with a TV and current newspapers and magazines. Facilities for indoor and outdoor games are also provided in the hostel. The administration of the hostel is supervised by the hostel superintendent and one hostel monitor from the hostel boarders. The hostel and the mess are run by a hostel committee consisting of hostel superintendent, staff member & students. Due to limitation of seats, hostel accommodation is provided to students from their 2nd year of degree, strictly by the first-cum-first-serve basis as well as considering the distance between the home and the institute. However, this is subject to change from time to time.

=== Students' Association ===
The Students' Association, which is apolitical in nature, provides an opportunity to the students for training in organising the various extra-curricular activities, such as sports, Fest, and the teacher-student match. All students of the college, irrespective of the department, are members. It has its own constitution and functions through an executive council and sub-committees. Members are elected by indirect election. Students are united by the GCETTB STUDENTS'ASSOCIATION. Cultural activities include ALFRESCO (Annual Cultural Cum Techo-Management Fiesta), INIZIO (Freshers' Welcome), Farewell of final year students, REMINISCENCE (Alumni Meet/Reunion), Blood Donation Camp, Cloth Distribution and so on. The Students' Union published their first annual Magazine, 'Konika' in 2003. There is a library operated by the Students' Union. The Students' Union conducts the annual Inter-Department Tournament, which includes the annual cricket tournament, football tournament, badminton tournament. There are 11 portfolios in the Union - President, Vice President, General Secretary, Assistant General Secretary, Finance General Secretary, Cultural Secretary, Games & Common Room Secretary, Education Secretary, Orientation Secretary, Career Secretary, Alumni Liaison.<

=== Achievements ===
Technical Education Quality Improvement Programme (TEQIP) was envisaged as a long-term programme of about 10–12 years duration to be implemented in 2-3 phases for transformation of the Technical Education System with the World Bank assistance. The broad objectives of the Programme are to create an environment in which engineering institutions selected under the Programme can achieve their own targets for excellence and sustain the same with autonomy and accountability, support development. The TEQIP Phase - II is aimed to upscale and support ongoing efforts of Government of India (GOI) in improving quality of technical education and enhance existing capabilities of the Institutions to become dynamic, demand-driven, quality conscious, efficient, forward-looking and responsive.

=== Festivals ===
- Saraswati Puja has been a keen event to be organised by GCETTB every year and its significance has been well acknowledged by the people of Berhampore. The event would mainly focus on two days of Saraswati Puja celebration and concluding it with idol immersion on the third day. The two days celebration will include, puja celebration, cultural programs by various institutions, college performance, college band with a lot of enthusiasm and fun.
- Freshers
- Alfresco (Techno-Cultural Fest)

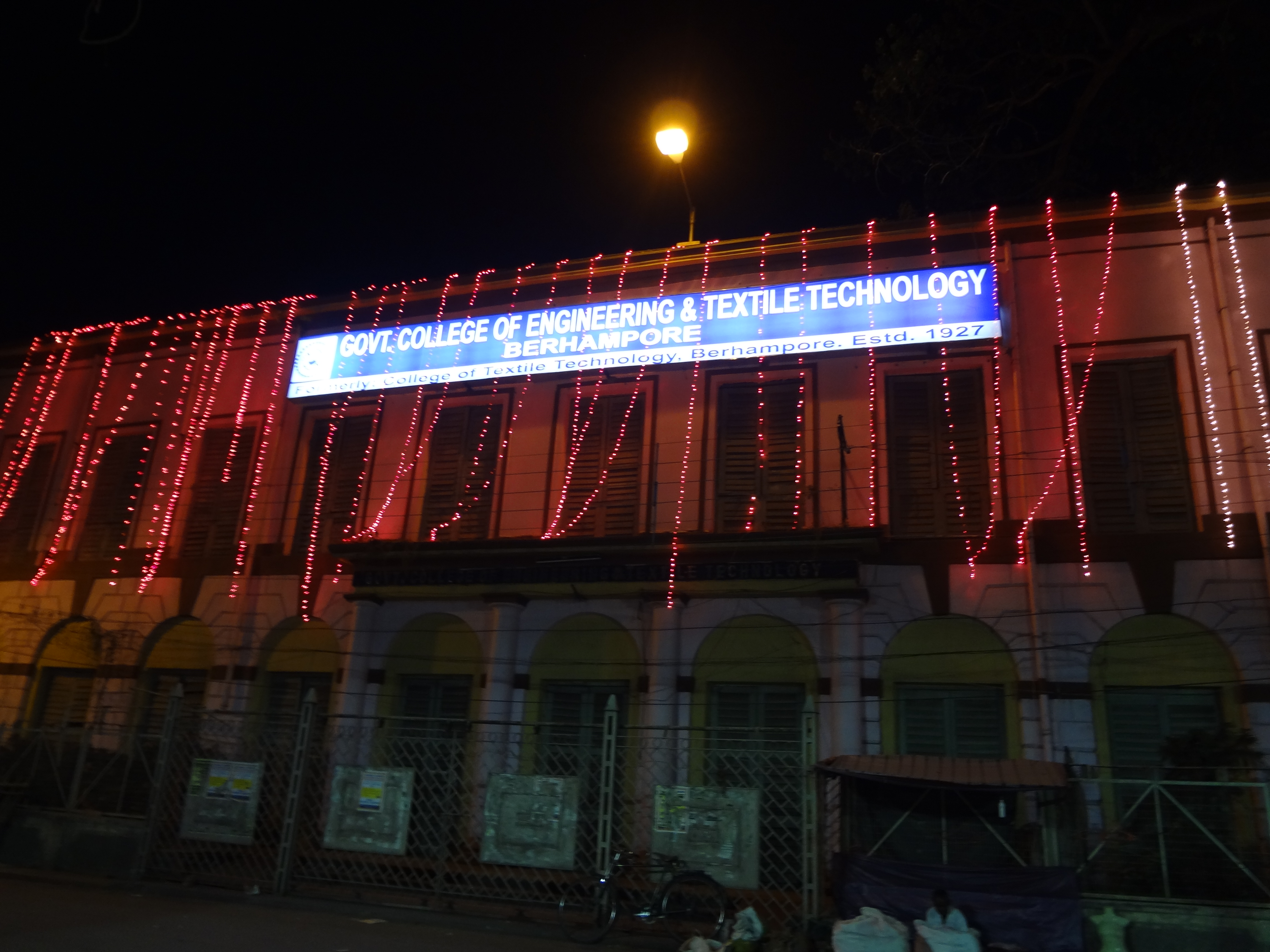
During Fest

- Reunion

== See also ==
- Government College of Engineering & Textile Technology, Serampore
- National Institute of Fashion Technology Kolkata
