= West Bengal Joint Entrance Examinations Board =

- পশ্চিমবঙ্গ জয়েন্ট এন্ট্রান্স এক্সামিনেশন বোর্ড
- Logo of WBJEEB

Statutory Body overview
- Formed: March 2, 1962; 64 years ago
- Type: For Conducting Entrance Examinations, eCounselling & Admission Services
- Jurisdiction: Government of West Bengal
- Status: Active
- Headquarters: RUPANNA DB-118, Sector-I, Salt Lake City, Kolkata - 700064
- Statutory Body executive: Prof. (Dr.) Goutam Paul, Chairman
- Parent department: Department of Higher Education, GoWB
- Website: Board Portal: wbjeeb.in Exam Portal: wbjeeb.nic.in

The West Bengal Joint Entrance Examinations Board is the State Government administered Statutory Body established by Government of West Bengal. It conducts Common Entrance Examinations for admission to undergraduate and postgraduate Professional, Vocational and General Degree Courses in the state of West Bengal, India. It conducts the West Bengal Joint Entrance Examination annually.

== Examinations ==
Following are the exams conducted by the WBJEEB every year.

=== For Undergraduate/Diploma Courses ===
- West Bengal Joint Entrance Examination (WBJEE)
- Joint Entrance Test for Nursing, Paramedical and Allied Sciences (Under Graduate) (JENPAS-UG)
- Joint Entrance for Lateral Entry Test in to B.E., B.Tech., B.Pharm. (JELET)
- Auxiliary Nursing & Midwifery (Revised) and General Nursing & Midwifery [ANM(R) & GNM]
- Joint Entrance for Post Basic Nursing (JEPBN)

=== For Postgraduate Courses ===
- Joint Entrance for MCA (JECA)
- Joint Entrance Test for M. Sc. Nursing (JEMScN)
- Joint Entrance for Paramedical & Allied Sciences PG (JEMAS-PG)
