= Applied Electronics and Instrumentation Engineering =

Branch of engineering focused on measurement and instrumentation

Applied Electronics & Instrumentation Engineering is an advanced branch of engineering which deals with the application of existing or known scientific knowledge in electronics, instrumentation, measurements and control for any process, practical calibration of instruments, automation of processes etc. It is a combination of Electronics and Instrumentation Engineering. This branch is an industry-oriented engineering branch which needs more knowledge and experience in industrial applications to excel in a career. The course has been introduced in many universities across India. Many universities have different variants of courses like Electronics & Instrumentation Engineering, Instrumentation Engineering etc.

Apart from covering core subjects such as Industrial Instrumentation, Measurements, Sensors & Transducers, Process Control, Bio-Medical Instrumentation and Robotics, students deal with software and hardware topics such as Microprocessor and Microcontroller-based instrumentation, VLSI and Embedded System designs, pSPICE, Computer Architecture and organization, Virtual Instrumentation (LabVIEW), Industrial Automation (PLC, SCADA etc.) and computer control of processes. Computer languages such as C and C++ are also part of the curriculum.
