= Maulana Abul Kalam Azad University of Technology =

Public university in West Bengal, India

- Former name: West Bengal University of Technology
- Motto: In Pursuit of Knowledge and Excellence
- Type: Public technical university
- Established: 16 July 2001 (25 years ago)
- Accreditation: NAAC; NBA
- Academic affiliations: AICTE; AIU; UGC
- Budget: ₹57.01 crore (US$5.9 million) (FY2024–25 est.)
- Chancellor: Governor of West Bengal
- Vice-Chancellor: Tapas Chakraborty
- Faculty: 146 (2025)
- Students: 2,740 (2025)
- Undergraduates: 1,768 (2025)
- Postgraduates: 959 (2025)
- Doctoral students: 13 (2025)
- Location: Haringhata, West Bengal, India; 22°57′25.34″N 88°32′36.46″E
- Campus: Semi Urban 40 acres (16 ha)
- Newspaper: Tech Vistas
- Website: makautwb.ac.in

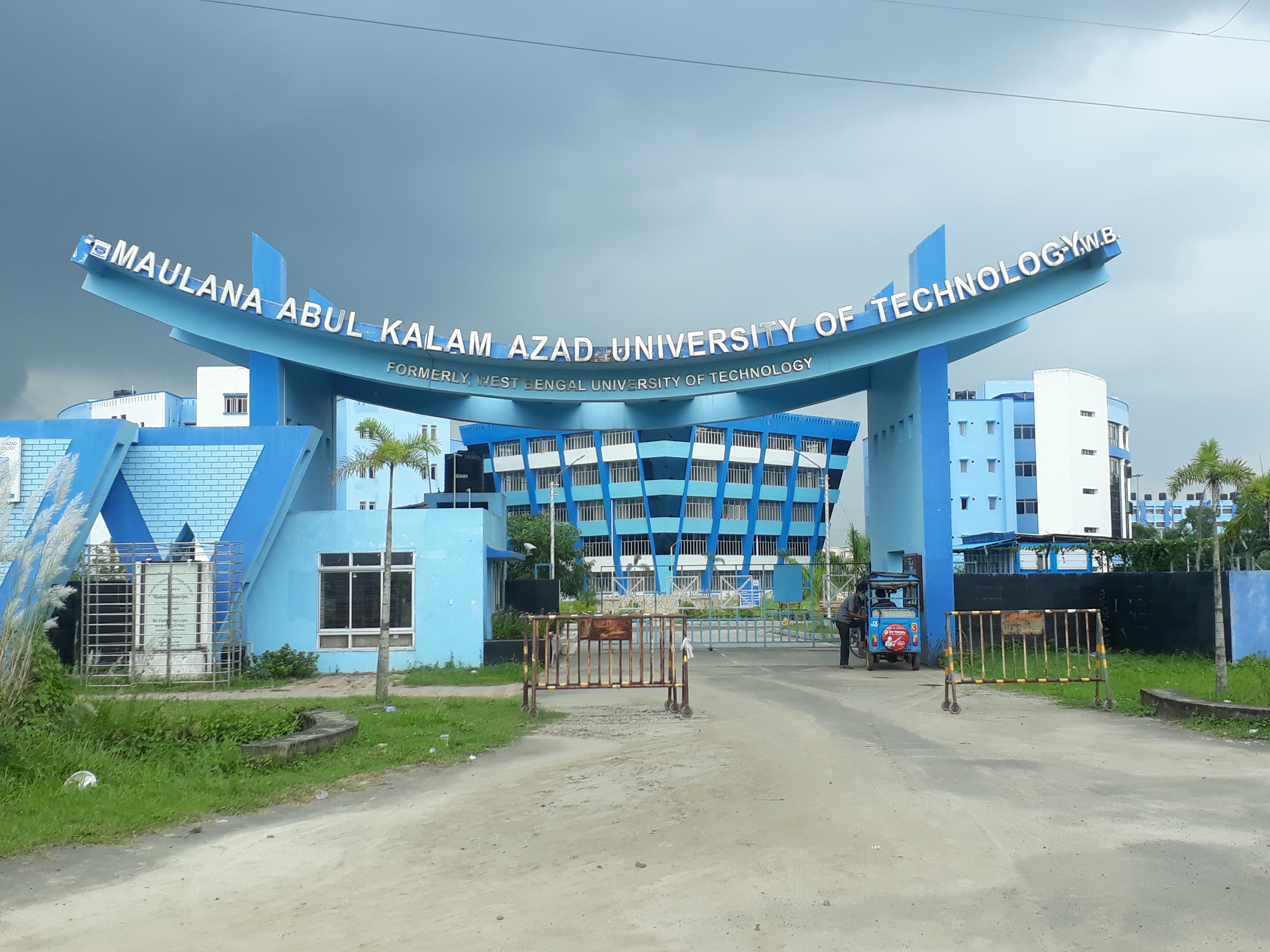
MAKAUT entrance gate in Haringhata

Maulana Abul Kalam Azad University of Technology, West Bengal (MAKAUT, WB), formerly known as West Bengal University of Technology (WBUT), is a public technical university located in Haringhata, West Bengal, India. Established in 2001 by the West Bengal legislature, it is fully funded by the Government of West Bengal. The university provides management and engineering degrees through affiliated colleges and in-house departments.

== History ==
An expert committee was set up on 31 December 1998 by the Government of West Bengal, under the Chairmanship of Ashesh Prosad Mitra, for establishing a university of engineering and technology in West Bengal. The university was formalized on 15 January 2001 by an act of the West Bengal Legislature. The university changed its name from West Bengal University of Technology to the current one in April 2015. From 2023 University started to give access to DigiLocker System to Students.

== Campus ==
The university has a main campus covering approximately 40 acres at Haringhata, provided by the Government of West Bengal. Hostels accommodate both male and female students. The university is located in between Bidhan Chandra Krishi Viswavidyalaya and IISER Kolkata.

== Organisation and administration ==
=== Schools, Departments & Centers ===
The university has 11 different Schools of Studies and there are 75 Undergraduate and 100 post-graduate courses.

Schools	Department and Centres
School of biological science and technology	Biotechnology
School of biological science and technology	Bioinformatics
School of biological science and technology	Applied Biology
School of biological science and technology	Life Sciences
School of biological science and technology	Centre for Bio Resource Management & Bioeconomy
School of computer science & engineering	Computer science and engineering
School of information science and technology	Information technology
School of information science and technology	Emerging technologies
School of information science and technology	Information science-Undergraduate
School of information science and technology	Information science-Postgraduate
School of information science and technology	Computer Applications
School of information science and technology	Geo-informatics and Spatial sciences
School of engineering science & technology	Industrial Engineering and Management
School of engineering science & technology	Microelectronics and VLSI Technology
School of engineering science & technology	Centre for Robotics & 3D Printing
School of engineering science & technology	Centre for Biomedical engineering
School of energy and environmental engineering	Environmental science
School of energy and environmental engineering	Renewable Energy Engineering
School of energy and environmental engineering	Centre for Waste utilization
School of management science	Management & Business administration
School of management science	Management & Business Studies
School of management science	Undergraduate Business Studies
School of management science	Hospital administration & Management
School of management science	Hospitality & Hotel administration
School of applied science & technology	Applied Chemistry
School of applied science & technology	Applied Mathematics
School of applied science & technology	Applied Physics
School of applied science & technology	Applied Statistics
School of applied science & technology	Forensic science & Technology
School of applied science & technology	Materials science & Technology
School of food science & agro technology	Food Science
School of food science & agro technology	Food technology
School of pharmaceutical science & health care technology	Pharmaceutical technology
School of humanities and social sciences	Applied economics
School of humanities and social sciences	Applied psychology
School of humanities and social sciences	Linguistics
School of humanities and social sciences	Humanities
School of media science & entertainment	Media Science
School of media science & entertainment	Multimedia technology
School of planning & architecture design	Archaeology (Heritage Cell)

== Academics ==
=== Rankings ===
University rankings

Engineering – India
- NIRF (2024): 101-150

The National Institutional Ranking Framework (NIRF) ranked it 157 among engineering colleges in 2020, 158 in 2021. And gave rank band 201–250 in 2022 and 101–150 in 2023 & 2024. In 2024, NIRF's newly introduced parameter, "State Public University" it ranked within 51-100.

=== Accreditation and recognition ===
The university is recognized by the University Grants Commission (UGC). It has been awarded B++ with a Cumulative Grade Point Average (CGPA) of 2.87 by the NAAC.

In the year 2022 University received NBA accreditation for two Undergraduate B.Tech. courses in CSE and IT for 3 years and for Postgraduate M.Tech. course in Biotechnology for 6 years.

== See also ==
- List of universities in West Bengal
- List of educational institutions in West Bengal
- Distance Education Bureau
- University Grants Commission (India)
