= University Institute of Technology, Burdwan University =

Engineering college in West Bengal, India

University Institute of Technology, The University of Burdwan
- বর্ধমান বিশ্ববিদ্যালয় প্রযুক্তিবিদ্যা প্রতিষ্ঠান
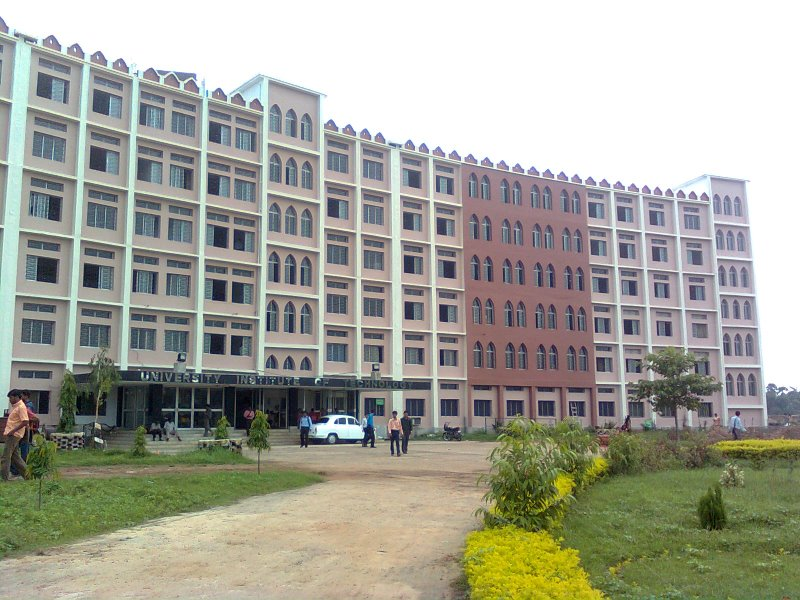
- The State of the art building of UIT
- Other name: UIT
- Motto: sā vidyā yā vimuktaye
- Motto in English: Learning Leads To Emancipation
- Type: Public Institute of Technology
- Established: 15 June 1999 (27 years ago)
- Founder: Buddhadeb Bhattacharjee
- Parent institution: University of Burdwan
- Accreditation: NAAC
- Affiliations: Government of West Bengal
- Academic affiliations: UGC; AICTE; NBA
- Chancellor: Governor of West Bengal
- Vice-Chancellor: Prof. Sankar Kumar Nath
- Principal: Sunil Karforma
- Dean: Abhijit Mazumdar
- Academic staff: 80 (2024)
- Administrative staff: 40 (2024)
- Total staff: 150 (2024)
- Students: 1656 (2024)
- Undergraduates: 1584 (2024)
- Postgraduates: 72 (2024)
- Location: Burdwan, Purba Bardhaman district, West Bengal, 713104, India; 23.257°N 87.846°E
- Campus: 400 acres (160 ha); Urban Academic campus at Golapbag
- Language: Official: English; Unofficial: Bengali, Hindi
- Acronym: UITBU
- Nickname: UITians
- Sporting affiliations: BU Inter Collegiate Sports Meet
- Website: Official Website of UIT
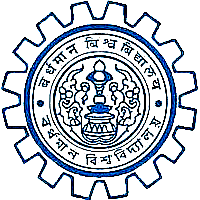
- Seal of UITBU

University Institute of Technology, The University of Burdwan (abbr. UITBU) is a NAAC "A"-accredited technological institute under the TEQIP initiative. It represents the Faculty of Engineering & Technology (FET), constituent to the University of Burdwan, located in Burdwan. It is the only Government Engineering Public Technical Institute located in Purba Bardhaman district.

== History ==
It was established in the year 1999 as an engineering department of The University of Burdwan which represented the former engineering faculty of the Regional Engineering College (R.E.C.) Durgapur (now known as NIT Durgapur).

The institute has the status of a professional institute of technology, jointly governed by the University of Burdwan and the Government of West Bengal. Buddhadeb Bhattacharjee, then Chief Minister of West Bengal, inaugurated the UIT building on 4 September 2001 under The University of Burdwan Act, 1981. With the approval of the Government of West Bengal and the AICTE, three graduate engineering courses, viz., Computer Science & Engineering (CSE), Electronics & Communication Engineering (ECE), and Information Technology (IT) were introduced from the 2000 session. From 2003, Applied Electronics and Instrumentation Engineering (AEIE) started. Electrical Engineering (EE) and Civil Engineering (CE) were introduced in 2008.

== Location & Campus ==
The institute is located about 100 km northwest of Kolkata, on the southern side of the Grand Trunk Road. The closest airports are Netaji Subhas Chandra Bose International Airport in Kolkata and Kazi Nazrul Islam Airport in Durgapur. The Grand Trunk Road and the Barddhaman Junction railway station connect the campus with distant parts of West Bengal and other regions of India, facilitating smooth travel for students between their homes and the institution.

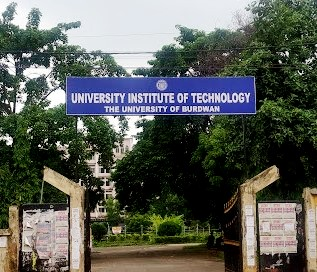
Main Gate of UIT

The institution is situated in the academic campus of the University at Golapbag. The campus spans over 400 acres. The hostels are:

- Banabas Boys' Hostel (for first-year UG boys only)
- S.N. Bose Boys' Hostel
- J.C. Bose Boys' Hostel
- Madame Curie Girls' Hostel

== Academics ==
=== Admission ===
The Annual intake is 360 students for B.E. for which the candidate have to clear the WBJEE and have to carry a mandatory threshold marks in Higher Secondary Examination. The annual intake is 36 for M.E. courses for which GATE score is considered for admission. The institute also accept 36 students in total from lateral entry (admitted directly into the 2nd year of any B.E. discipline) for which a candidate either should have a Diploma in Engineering or graduated in any science stream with a B.Sc. degree with mandatory Mathematics as a subject in their coursework and the candidate have to pass the WBJEEB JELET exam.

=== Centre of Excellence ===
Institute-industry partnership cell (IIPC): The university has opened an IIPC with financial assistance from AICTE. A university MBA Professor looks after the activity of the cell. It is looked after by a committee composed of Placement Officer, Faculty Members and representatives of the Final Year students.

Institute of Electronics and Telecommunication Engineers (IETE): The Professional Activity Center of the IETE, a body of the Government of India for Information Technology, Computer Science & Engineering and Electronics and Communication Engineering was opened in 2002. It was upgraded to the standard of Subcenter in 2004. The purpose of this center is to inject professionalism into the outlook of the students through seminars, invited lectures and workshops.

Academic Programs
Degree	Departments	General Science & Engineering and Humanities Courses (Inter-Disciplinary)
Bachelor of Engineering (B.E.)	Computer Science & Engineering; Electrical Engineering; Electronics & Communication Engineering; Information Technology; Civil Engineering; Applied Electronics and Instrumentation Engineering	Mathematics List: Linear Algebra; Discrete mathematics; Calculus; Differential Equations; Complex Analysis; Probability & Statistics; Computational Methods; Physics List: Classical Mechanics; Statistical Mechanics; Theory of Relativity; Quantum Mechanics; Chemistry; Biology; Environmental Science; Mechanical Engineering List: Engineering Mechanics; Fluid Mechanics & Thermodynamics; Manufacturing Engineering; Engineering Drawing & CAD; Power Plant Engineering; Programming for Problem Solving List: C; Python; Algorithm; Artificial Intelligence List: Machine Learning; Deep Learning; Reinforcement Learning; Humanities List: English; Values & Ethics; Linguistics; Business communication; Industrial Management & Entrepreneurship; Constitution of India; Economics
Master of Engineering (M.E.)	Computer Science & Engineering; Electronics & Instrumentation Engineering	

=== National rankings ===
University rankings

Global – Overall
- USNWR Global: 1921 (2024–25)

Regional – Overall
- QS Asia: 621–640
- USNWR Asia: 775 (2024–25)

National – Overall
- USNWR National: 79 (2024–25)

University rankings

General – India
- NIRF (Overall) (2024): 151–200
- NIRF (Universities) (2024): 101–150

The parent institution of UIT, i.e., the University of Burdwan, was ranked 36th in India and 3rd in West Bengal (after Jadavpur University and University of Calcutta) in the State Public Universities category by the National Institutional Ranking Framework (NIRF) in 2024.

=== Library ===
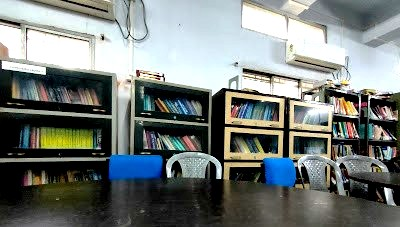
Library room of UIT

Central library The Central library has more than 1,50,000 volumes of books with 5000 titles, 24000 journals, and 1700 reports are subscribed.

UIT library The institute library has more than 30,000 volumes of textbooks with 4,000 titles. The library is computerized. The library receives 20 national and 30 international journals. The library has a reading room. The library subscribes to on-line, digital libraries of academic societies like IEEE, IET, and ACM.

== Student life ==
=== Cultural and technical fests ===
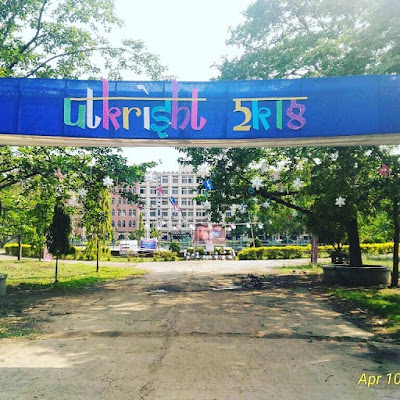
Technical Fest Utkrisht 2018

UIT-BU conducts its cultural fest "WALTZ" and its technical fest "UTKRISHT" every year.

=== Extracurricular activities ===
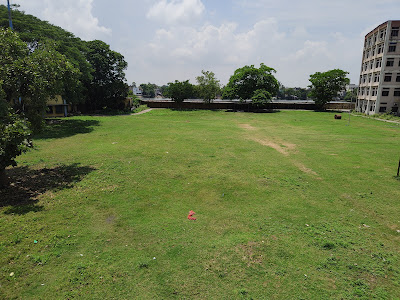
Playground of UIT

The institute has its NSS unit and the REC Club (Renewable Energy Club), through which students engage in numerous extracurricular activities. The college also features an E-Cell, with a student panel elected from among the student body. A departmental journal is published every three years. The institute encourages students to participate in various sports activities, including cricket, football, badminton, volleyball, athletics, and more, to maintain both a healthy body and a strong mind. An annual sports event is organized by the institution, and an inter-collegiate sports meet is hosted by the university, involving other affiliated colleges.

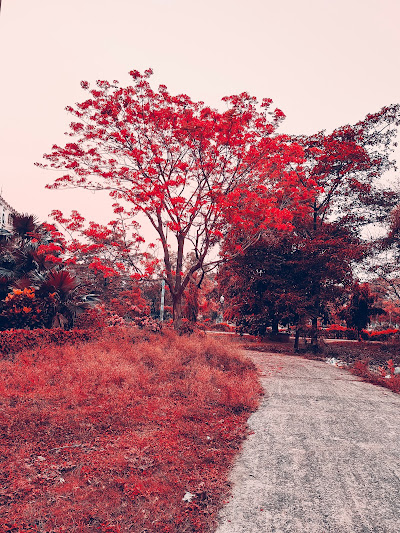
Cherry Blossom Tree of UIT

=== Training and Placement ===
The Training & Placement Cell consists of the Training & Placement Officer, college authorities, faculty members, and students. The cell collaborates with non-profit organizations for information related to campus recruitment and further study opportunities. Some of the prominent companies hiring UIT students include TCS, Wipro, Infosys, L&T, Capgemini, IBM, HCL, Deloitte, Pinnacle, and Byju's. Additionally, some students have successfully secured Government jobs, including positions in Civil Services and Engineering Services, the Defence Services, Public Sector Undertakings, ISRO, DRDO, and even NASA. Furthermore, many students are encouraged to pursue higher studies, including M.Tech and Ph.D., at prestigious institutions such as IITs, NITs, and others.

== Notable alumni ==
- Amalendu Chandra, (Shanti Swarup Bhatnagar laureate)
- Akhil Ranjan Chakravarty, (Shanti Swarup Bhatnagar laureate)
- Saleh Ali Al-Kharabsheh, (Minister of Energy and Mineral Resources, Jordan)
- Kamanio Chattopadhyay, (an Indian materials engineer)

== See also ==
- Burdwan University
- NIT Durgapur
- List of universities in India
- Universities and colleges in India
