= Bankura Christian College =

College in West Bengal

- Type: Undergraduate & Postgraduate college
- Established: 1903; 123 years ago
- Affiliations: Bankura University
- Chairman: The Rt. Rev. Sameer Issac Khimla, Bishop, Diocese of Durgapur (CNI)
- Principal: Dr. Fatikk Baran Mondal
- Location: Bankura, West Bengal, India; 23.2381°N 87.0593°E
- Campus: Urban
- Website: https://bankurachristiancollege.in/
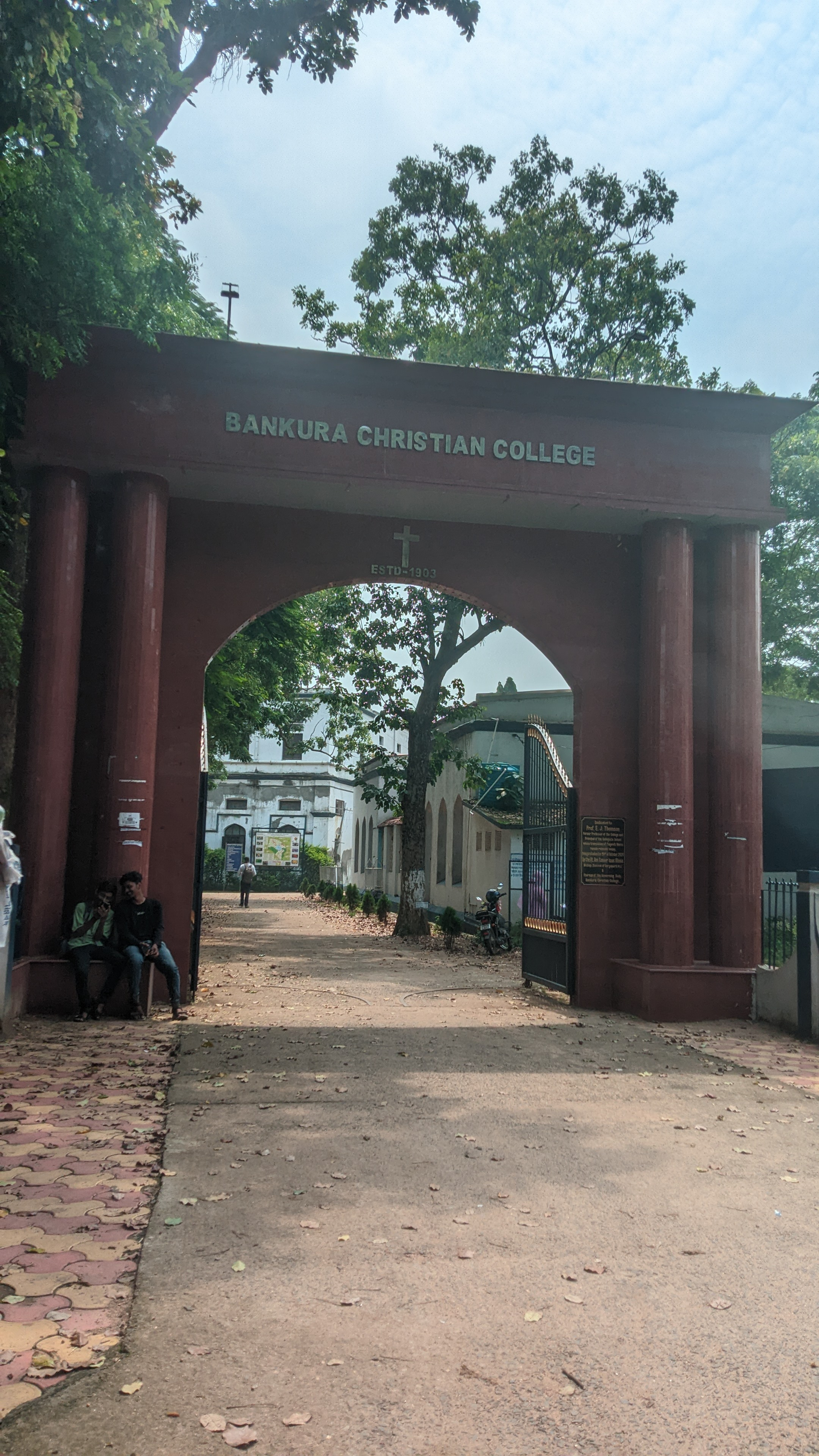

Bankura Christian College, established in 1903, is the oldest college in Bankura district in India. It offers undergraduate courses in arts and sciences. It is affiliated with the Bankura University.

== History ==
List of Principals
J. Mitchell	1903-1910
A. E. Brown	1910-1927
A. R. Spooner	1927-1933
William Bailey	1933-1937
C. F. Ball	1937-1943
W. J. Culshow	1943-1949
A. K. Mundle	1949-1966
R. N. Das	1966-1971
R. L. Sarkar	1971-1971
S. Singh	1971-1981
Teacher-in-charge	1981-1985
Mark Mir	1985-1987
Teacher-in-charge	1987-1992
Dr. Richard R. N. Bajpai	1992–2014
Dr Fatik Baran Mandal	2014-2024

Bankura Christian College was established by the Wesleyan Missionary Society in 1903 to prepare students for the F. A. Examination only. On 16 July 1906, by the Honourable Mr. Lancelot Hare, Officiating Lieutenant-Governor of Bengal, laid the foundation stone of the college building on a land of 115 bighas near the center of the town.

The application from the Wesleyan Mission College, Bankura, for affiliation to the Calcutta University was granted in April 1907. The affiliation was for the standard of the Intermediate Examination in Arts in the subjects of English, Sanskrit, History, Logic and Mathematics and up to the B. A. Standard in the subjects of English, Sanskrit, History, Political Economy and Political Philosophy and Mental and Moral Philosophy, and also up to the standard of the F. A. Examination in 1908 in the subjects of English, Sanskrit, History, Logic, Mathematics and Physics and Chemistry.

In 1961, the affiliation was changed to Burdwan University and since 2017, the college is affiliated to Bankura University.

== Departments and courses ==
The college offers different undergraduate and postgraduate courses and aims at imparting education to the undergraduates of lower- and middle-class people of Bankura and its adjoining areas.

=== Science ===
Science faculty consists of the departments of Chemistry, Physics, Mathematics, Computer Science & Application, Botany, Zoology, Physiology, Nutrition, Environmental Science, Electronics, and Economics.

=== Arts ===
Arts faculty consists of departments of Bengali, English, Sanskrit, History, Geography, Political Science, Philosophy, Sociology, and Physical Education.

== Real-time weather reporting ==
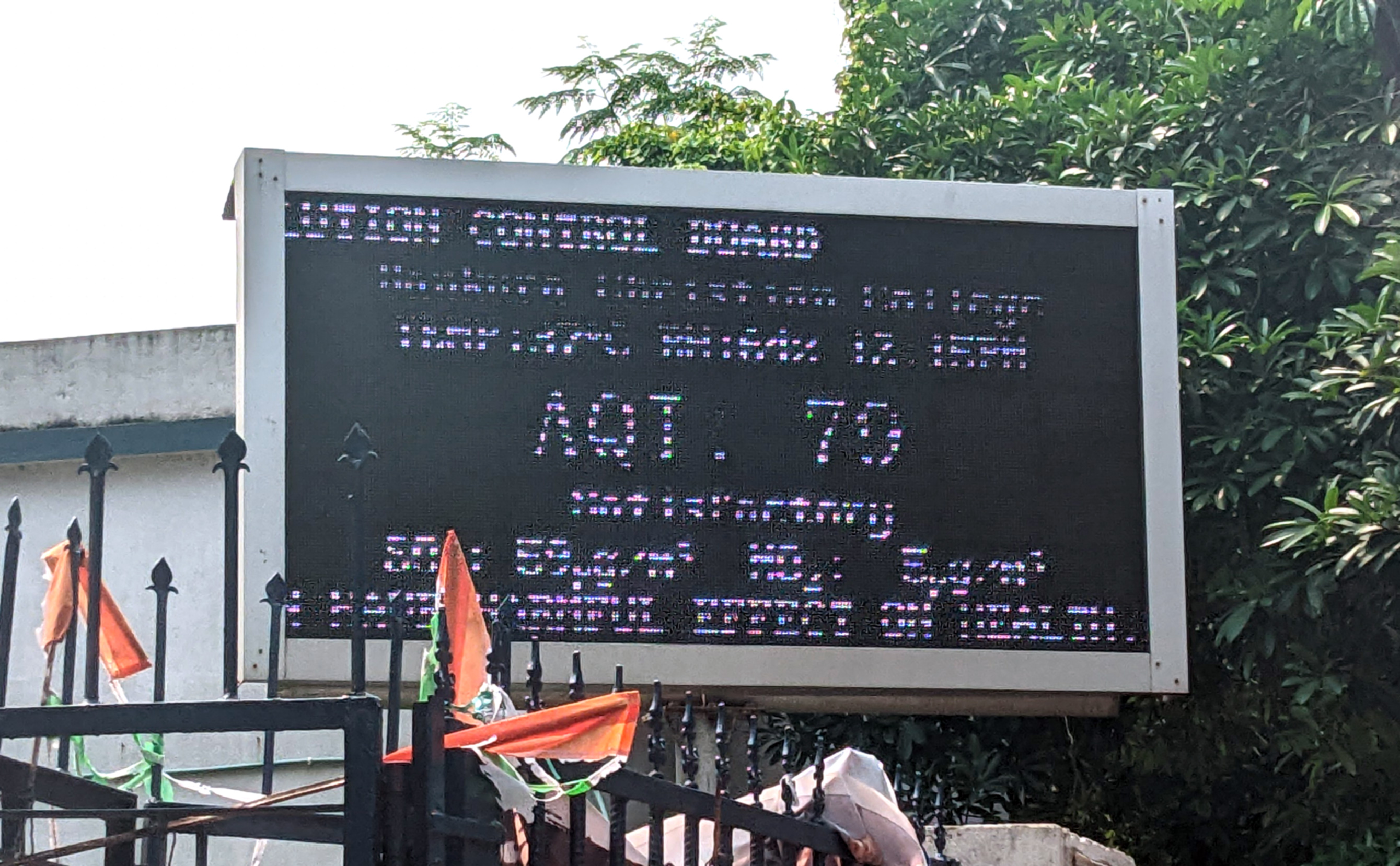
Air quality index board at Bankura Christian College

The Geography Department started real-time weather reporting of Bankura District in 2012.

== Netaji Subhas Open University Study Center ==
Bankura Christian College is an authorized study center of Netaji Subhas Open University (N.S.O.U.) since 1999. This center offers undergraduate and postgraduate degree in different subject.

== Computer center ==
The college has introduced Webel Informatics Ltd to manage computers.

== Journals ==
The English Department publishes two international journals: Wesleyan Journal of Research and Appropriations Journal.

== Notable alumni ==
- Gouri Sankar Bandyopadhyay, historian.
- Manik Bandopadhyay, writer, novelist.
- Khudiram Das, scholar, educationist, critic, litterateur, an authority on Rabindra literature and linguistic expert.
- Dinesh Chandra Gorai, former Bishop of Calcutta
- Balaram Mukhopadhyay, scientist
- Mohammad Shamsuzzoha: First Martyred Intellectual of Bangladesh. Former Professor and reader at University of Rajshahi. Sacrificed his life during the 1969 East Pakistan mass uprising.
- Maniklal Sinha, archaeologist of Rarh, freedom fighter, novelist

== See also ==
- List of institutions of higher education in West Bengal
- Education in India
- Education in West Bengal
