= Gouri Sankar Bandyopadhyay =

Indian historian (born 1962)

- গৌরী শংকর বন্দ্যোপাধ্যায়
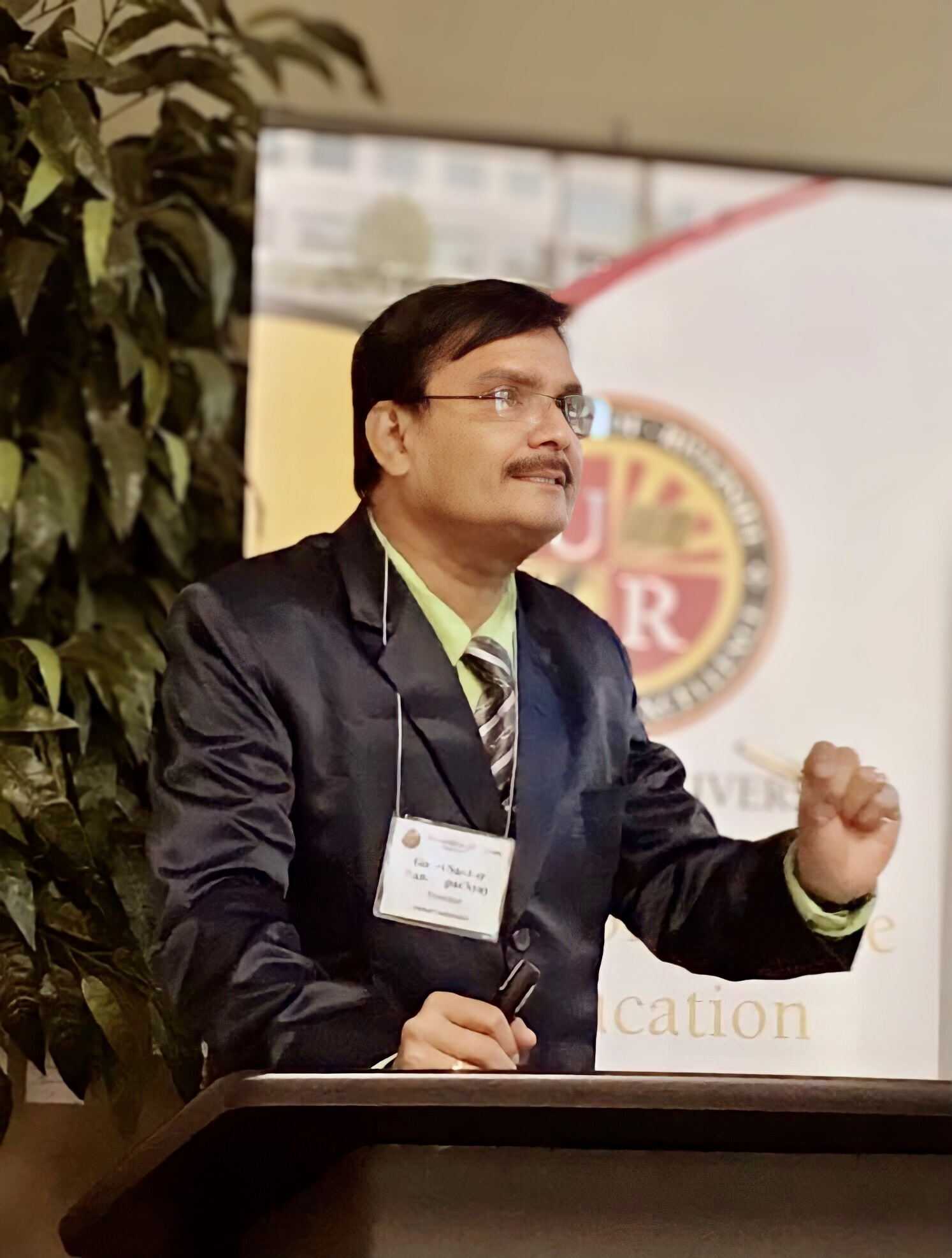
- Bandyopadhyay delivering lecture at Riverside University, US in 2019
- Born: 26 December 1962 (age 63); Hooghly, West Bengal, India
- Other name: Gouri Sankar Banerjee
- Spouse: Dr. Santwana Banerjee
- Children: One, Deep Sankar Banerjee
- Awards: Best Educationist Award 2015 from International Institute of Education and Management

Academic background
- Education: The University of Burdwan
- Academic advisors: Sir Jack Goody; Bill Cope (academic)

Academic work
- Discipline: Ancestral Cult; Folk religion in Bengal; Contemporary history
- Institutions: Syamsundar College, Burdwan, India

Gouri Sankar Bandyopadhyay (born 26 December 1962) is a historian based in West Bengal, India. He was awarded as the Best Educationist 2015 from the International Institute of Education and Management, New Delhi, India. He is serving as the principal of Syamsundar College since 2015. Bandyopadhyay spent his early days serving as a lecturer and reader in the Department of History at Saldiha College and Bankura Christian College in Bankura, West Bengal, India. He is also in the scientific committee of the International Scientific Conference on Economic and Scientific Development.

== Early life, Academic Career and Research ==
Bandyopadhyay was born on 26 December 1962 to a Bengali Brahmin family in a village namely 'Batanal' in Hooghly District in the State of West Bengal, India. His father Late Ram Sankar Banerjee was the headmaster of a government sponsored school in West Bengal. His mother Mrs. Mira Banerjee is a housewife. Bandyopadhyay is the elder son of Late Ram Sankar Banerjee. He completed his undergraduate studies at Kamarpukur College and obtained his master's degree in history from The University of Burdwan. He obtained his PhD from The University of Burdwan and availed the University Research Fellowship in the year 1988. In 1989 he joined the Museum & Art Gallery of The University of Burdwan as Assistant Curator. Then he served Saldiha College and Bankura Christian College as Lecturer and Reader in History respectively and presently serving as the Principal of Syamsundar College. Earlier he was also attached with the Department of History, Kalyani University as a Guest Faculty. Professor Bandyopadhyay was awarded the Post-doctoral Research Grant to carry out his innovative field survey-based research on popular religion and mass culture of rural Bengal by the Indian Council of Historical research, New Delhi in 1999–2000. By this time he had been recognized as guide-supervisor for Ph.D. students of history by the University of Burdwan.

== Publication of Research Papers, Articles and Books ==
Professor Bandyopadhyay has contributed more than 60 Research Papers and Articles and nearly 40 research papers are cited in the field of contemporary history and Folk religion in several peer-reviewed International and national level journals namely 'Victims of Doubled-Edged Violence: A Socio-political Study of Tribal-rural Folks Living in the Forest Tract of Eastern India' published by the Common Ground Publishers, International Journal of Interdisciplinary Social Sciences, Ravenshaw Historical Journal, and the Journal of Numismatic Society of India etc. Dr. Bandyopadhyay has written 13 books and monographs on different subjects and the list includes 'Folk Religion and Mass Culture in Rural Bengal—Tradition and Transformation' (2007), 'Ancestral Cult of Bengal: A Comparative Study' (2011), 'Itihaser Aloy Samakalin Biswa—1945-2013' (in Bengali) etc. Few of his books have been recommended by West Bengal Council for Higher Secondary Education and other institutes and universities as well. Bandyopadhyay presented his research papers in several international conferences held in the University of Cambridge, Cambridge (5th International Conference on Interdisciplinary Social Sciences, 2010), 2nd international economic and social development conference, Paris (2013), 11th International Conference on Child and Adolescent Psychopathology ICCAP2016 at Roehampton University, 2016, London, UK, International Conference on Peace and Conflict Management ICPCM 2017, Global Academic Research Institute (GARI), 2017, Colombo, Sri Lanka, Srinakharinwirot University, Bangkok, Malaysian Institute of Technology, Penang, Malaysia, Itihas Academy, Dhaka, Bangladesh etc. Prof. Bandyopadhyay also delivered his lecture in the 14th International Oxford Symposium on Religious Studies, 2018, University of Oxford, UK, Summer Global Education Conference (August 2019) at University of Riverside, California, USA and 14th International RAIS conference on Social Sciences and Humanities, Princeton Seminary, Princeton University, NJ, USA (August 2019). He has been nominated as the honorary member of the presidential board of scientific committee of the prestigious international esd conference. His recent book is entitled Jihad and Global Terrorism: Ongoing Islam Phobia and Its Coherent Responses which is published in the year of 2015. Apart from this he is also a distinguished creative writer. Some of his poems were published in Desh and many other literary magazines. His collection of poetry entitled 'Madhya Chaitre Mailbox' was published by Prtibhash Publisher, Kolkata in June 2009. Few of author's works are considered as reference, text and preserved in world renowned universities such as University of California (Berkeley, USA), Minnesota University(USA), Heidelberg University (Germany), Trove: Australian National Library, Parliament Library (New Delhi, India) and so on.

== Bibliography ==
- Hungry Times: Growing Vulnerability of People and Cultures in India and across the World, Eliva Press, Moldova, Europe, 2020.
- Bangla Sahitye Lokojibon O Lokosanskriti (in Bengali), Pustak Biponi, Calcutta, India 2020.
- Folk Religion and Mass Culture of Rural Bengal: Tradition and Transformation, Touchstone Publication, India, 2007.
- Jihad and Global Terrorism: Ongoing Islam Phobia and Its Coherent Responses, Touchstone Publication, India, 2015.
- Adhunik Biswa O Antarjartik Samparka 1919–1945 (Modern World and International Relations 1919–1945), (in Bengali), Progressive Publishers, Kolkata, 2011
- Ancestral Cult in Bengal—A Comparative Study, Touchstone (Progressive Pub.), Kolkata, 2011
- Itihaser Aloye Samakalin Biswa: 1945–2007, (Contemporary History of the World), (in Bengali), Progressive Publishers, Kolkata, 2007(recommended by West Bengal Council for Higher Secondary Education).
- Ucchamadhyamik Itihas, (vol. 1&2), (in Bengali), New Book Syndicate, Kolkata, 2005-06
- A Text Book of History, (vol. 1&2), Bengal Book Syndicate, Kolkata, 2005–06.
- School History (vol. 1, 2, 3), Bengal Book Syndicate, Kolkata, 2003–07.
- Itihas Katha (vol. 1&2), (in Bengali), New Book Syndicate, Kolkata, 2003–2005
- History & Civilisation of Ancient Rome (in Bengali), Jointly with Dr. Santwana Banerjee, Mitram Publishers, Kolkata, 2016

== Honours, awards and notable achievements ==
1. Sectional Session Chair (SSC) in the 14th International RAIS Conference on Social Sciences and Humanities 2019, Princeton University, New Jersey, US
2. Member, Scientific Committee, International ESD conference, Croatia
3. Associate editor, International Journal of Interdisciplinary Social Sciences, Illinois, US
4. Lifetime Member of Global Association for Humanities and Social Science Research (GAHSSR)
5. Life Member, Bharata Vidya Charcha Kendra, India
6. Vice President, Radha Sanskriti Gabeshona Kendra, India
7. Reviewer, Eliva Press Publication, Moldova, Europe.
8. Member, The Court of the University of Burdwan, India
9. Member, Standing Committee, The University of Burdwan, India
10. NAAC approved assessor/Peer Team Member
11. Nominee of West Bengal Council for Higher Education to Governing Body, Burdwan Raj College, India
12. Executive Council (EC) Member, All Bengal Principal's Council (ABPC), West Bengal, India
13. Life Member, Association of Indian College Principals.
14. Best Educationist Award - 2015, by International Institute of Education and Management, New Delhi.
15. Member of scientific committee in the International Scientific Conference on Economic and Scientific Development.
16. Lifetime Member of Social Science and Humanities Research Association (SSHRA) under EURASIA Research.
