= Priyabatra Mukherjee =

American medical researcher

Priyabrata Mukherjee
- Title: Peggy and Charles Stephenson Endowed Chair

Academic background
- Education: B.Sc., Chemistry (1992); M.Sc., Chemistry (1994); Ph.D., Chemistry (2000)
- Alma mater: University of Burdwan; University of Poona

Academic work
- Institutions: University of Oklahoma Health Sciences Center

Priyabrata Mukherjee is an American, academic researcher and professor. He is a Presbyterian Health Foundation presidential professor at the University of Oklahoma Health Sciences Center and associate director for translational research at Stephenson Cancer Center at the OU Health Sciences Center. He also holds the Peggy and Charles Stephenson endowed chair in cancer laboratory research at the OU Health Sciences Center.

Mukherjee's primary area of research revolves around tumor and tumor microenvironments. His research also deals with protein-nanoparticle interactions and their implication in angiogenesis-dependent disorder and cell-nanoparticle interactions and their implication in targeted therapy.

Mukherjee is a fellow of Royal Society of Chemistry, the American Institute for Medical and Biological Engineering, and the National Academy of Inventors. In 2018, he received the Outstanding Achievement Award from the Society of Asian American Scientists in Cancer Research.

== Early life and education ==
Mukherjee earned a M.S. from the University of Burdwan in 1994 and a Ph.D. from the University of Poona in 2000, both in chemistry. From 2001 to 2003, he served as a post-doctoral fellow at Texas Christian University. He later completed his fellowship at Harvard Medical School and then at the Mayo Clinic, Rochester, Minnesota.

== Career ==
In 2005, Murkherjee became an assistant professor at the Mayo Clinic in Rochester, Minnesota, and was promoted to associate professor in 2009. In 2013, he left the Mayo Clinic and joined the OU Health Sciences Center as a full professor in the Department of Pathology at the OU College of Medicine.

Mukherjee has also held several administrative position at Stephenson Cancer Center. He has served as co-director of the Frontiers in Translation Cancer Research since 2014, as co-director of the Nano-Medicine Program since 2015 and as associate director of translational research since 2018.

== Research ==
Mukherjee and his team speculated that cancer cells rewire metabolic pathways leading to enhanced lipid biogenesis and utilization to survive and thrive under different environmental stress such as hypoxia and cytotoxic insult. In this context, it had been reported that hydrogen sulfide (H_{2}S ) induced hibernation like phenotype in mice and protected them from hypoxic injury. It had also been reported that loss of H_{2}S synthesizing enzymes, such as CBS, sensitized a plethora of disease causing bacteria to antibiotics. In addition, mice genetically deficient in CBS displayed abnormal lipid metabolism with reduced body mass. In 2013, Mukherjee and his team demonstrated a pathological role of CBS in ovarian cancer.

Mukherjee and his team discovered that UBAP2 functions as a molecular switch that regulates macro-pinocytosis and tumor growth in pancreatic cancer.

Some of Mukherjee's research focuses on reprogramming tumor microenvironments. In this area, he has worked on disrupting CC-CAF crosstalk and abrogating the key cellular components participating in desmoplasia. Bidirectional crosstalk between cancer cells and cancer associated fibroblasts is considered to be the key molecular event that drives desmoplasia, particularly in pancreatic ductal adenocarcinoma (PDAC).

== Awards and honors ==
- 2001 - Best paper award in materials science, National Chemical Laboratory
- 2002 - Best paper award in materials science, National Chemical Laboratory
- 2018 - Outstanding Achievement Award, Society of Asian American Scientists in Cancer Research
- 2018 - Fred G. Silva Award, Department of Pathology at the University of Oklahoma
- 2018 - Fellow, Royal Society of Chemistry
- 2019 - Elected Fellow, American Institute of Medical and Biological Engineering
- 2020 - Elected Fellow, National Academy of Inventors

== Selected publications ==
- Mandal, D., Bolander, M. E., Mukhopadhyay, D., Sarkar, G., Mukherjee, P. (2006). The use of microorganisms for the formation of metal nanoparticles and their application. Applied Microbiology and Biotechnology, 69(5), 485–492.
- Mukherjee, P., Ahmad, A., Mandal, D., Senapati, S., Sainkar, S. R., Khan, M. I., Parishcha, R., Ajaykumar, P. V., Alam, M., Kumar, R., Sastry, M. (2001). Fungus-Mediated Synthesis of Silver Nanoparticles and Their Immobilization in the Mycelial Matrix: A Novel Biological Approach to Nanoparticle Synthesis. Nano Letters, 1(10), 515–519.
- Mukherjee, P., Ahmad, A., Mandal, D., Senapati, S., Sainkar, S. R., Khan, M. I., Parishcha, R., Ajaykumar, P. V., Alam, M., Kumar, R., Sastry, M. (2001). Fungus-Mediated Synthesis of Silver Nanoparticles and Their Immobilization in the Mycelial Matrix: A Novel Biological Approach to Nanoparticle Synthesis. Nano Letters, 1(10), 515–519.
- Bhattacharya, R., Mukherjee, P. (2008). Biological properties of "naked" metal nanoparticles (11th ed., vol. 60, pp. 1289–1306). Advanced Drug Delivery Reviews.
- Mukherjee, P., Senapati, S., Mandal, D., Ahmad, A., Khan, M. I., Kumar, R., Sastry, M. (2002). Extracellular synthesis of gold nanoparticles by the fungus Fusarium oxysporum. ChemBioChem, 3(5), 461–463.
- Arvizo, R. R., Bhattacharyya, S.*, Kudgus, R. A.*, Giri, K.*, Bhattacharya, R., Mukherjee, P.# (2012). Intrinsic therapeutic applications of noble metal nanoparticles: Past, present and future (7th ed., vol. 41, pp. 2943–2970). Chemical Society Reviews.
- Ahmad, A., Mukherjee, P., Mandal, D., Senapati, S., Khan, M. I., Kumar, R., Sastry, M. (2002). Enzyme mediated extracellular synthesis of CdS nanoparticles by the fungus, Fusarium oxysporum. Journal of the American Chemical Society, 124(41), 12108–12109.
- Arvizo, R. R., Miranda, O. R., Thompson, M. A., Pabelick, C. M., Bhattacharya, R., Robertson, J. D., Rotello, V. M., Prakash, Y. S., Mukherjee, P.# (2010). Effect of nanoparticle surface charge at the plasma membrane and beyond. Nano Letters, 10(7), 2543–2548.
- Mukherjee, P., Bhattacharya, R., Wang, P., Wang, L., Basu, S., Nagy, J. A., Atala, A., Mukhopadhyay, D., Soker, S. (2005). Antiangiogenic properties of gold nanoparticles. Clinical Cancer Research, 11(9), 3530–3534.
- Patra, C. R., Bhattacharya, R., Mukhopadhyay, D., Mukherjee, P. (2010). Fabrication of gold nanoparticles for targeted therapy in pancreatic cancer (3rd ed., vol. 62, pp. 346–361). Advanced Drug Delivery Reviews.
- Arvizo, R., Bhattacharya, R., Mukherjee, P. (2010). Gold nanoparticles: Opportunities and challenges in nanomedicine (6th ed., vol. 7, pp. 753–763). Expert Opinion on Drug Delivery.
