= Riksundar Banerjee =

Indian writer and folklorist

- ঋকসুন্দর ব্যানার্জী
- Born: August 9, 1987 (age 39); Kolkata, West Bengal, India
- Education: Jadavpur University (M.A., Bengali Literature); University of Burdwan (Ph.D.)
- Occupations: Writer; Folklorist; Screenwriter
- Writing career
- Genres: Folklore, ghost stories, nonfiction
- Notable works: The Book of Indian Ghosts (2021); Haunted Places of India (2023)

Riksundar Banerjee or Riksundar Bandyopadhyay (Bengali: ঋকসুন্দর ব্যানার্জী; born 9 August 1987) is an Indian writer from Kolkata, West Bengal, known for his nonfiction work on Indian ghost lore and folklore, as well as fiction and screenwriting.

== Early life and education ==
Banerjee earned a postgraduate degree (M.A.) in Bengali Literature from Jadavpur University. He was awarded a Ph.D. by the University of Burdwan in 2018 for his thesis Uncanny in Bengali Literature: Traditions and Evolution (Bengali: "বাংলা গল্প সাহিত্যে ভূত: পরম্পরা ও পরিবর্তমানতা").

== Career ==
Banerjee has written articles for several publications, including Anandabazar Patrika and Ei Samay.

In July 2019, he co-presented a paper titled "The Algorithm of Ghostliness" at Bond University.

He is a co-writer of the screenplay and dialogue for the Bengali film Bhotbhoti (Whispers of Mermaids). He also worked on the film Stuck and took part in "Stuck Discussion", a public discussion on the effects of AI and the supernatural on human life, held at the Triguna Sen Auditorium, Jadavpur University.

His book The Book of Indian Ghosts received a positive review in The Hindu.

== Published books ==
- Trainer Adda: Bangaleer Bhinno Sangskritik Porisor, 2014.
- Chhayashorir: Sekal Ekaler Bhooter Golpo, 2016.
- Probase Doiber Boshe, 2017.
- Cholar Pother Khorkuto, 2019.
- The Book of Indian Ghosts, 2021, Aleph.
- Haunted Places of India, 2023, Aleph.

== Published articles ==
Banerjee has written a regular column for The Telegraph India on haunted places in India, including:

- "The ghost who loved: Tinkle of anklets from the corridors of Calcutta High Court" (26 March 2022)
- "Ghost story: The spirit denizens of Kamalpur Zamindarbari" (25 April 2022)
- "Clip-clop, Clip-clop… there comes Warren Hastings' ghost at his Alipore house" (9 April 2022)
- "West Side (spook) Story: Halloween and the western ghosts" (31 October 2022)
