= Syamsundar College =

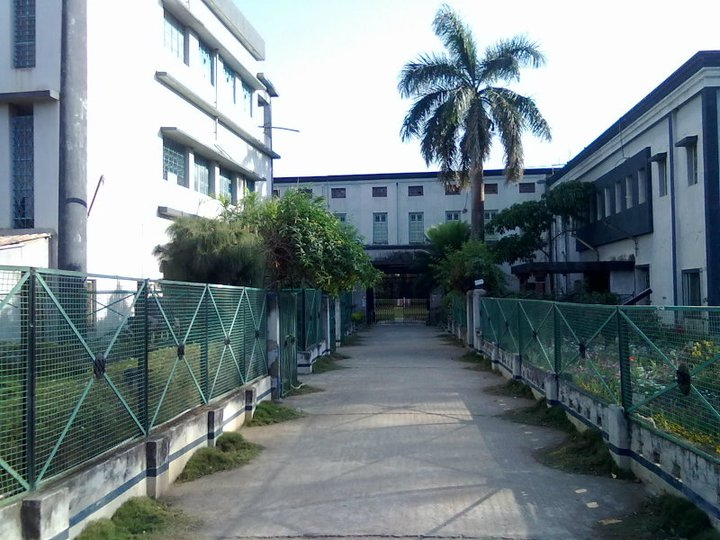
- Motto: Sa Vidya Ya Vimuktaye
- Type: Public
- Established: 1948; 78 years ago
- Affiliations: University of Burdwan
- Principal: Dr. Gouri Sankar Bandyopadhyay
- Location: Shyamsundar, Purba Bardhaman district, West Bengal, 713424, India; 23.1034864°N 87.8680817°E
- Campus: Urban
- Language: English, Bengali
- Website: Shyamsundar College

- Location within West Bengal Location within India

Syamsundar College, established in 1948, is the general degree college in Shyamsundar, Purba Bardhaman district. It offers undergraduate courses in arts, commerce and sciences. It is affiliated to the University of Burdwan.

== History ==
Syamsundar College was founded by late Raibahadur Bisalaksha Bose, a social worker of Shyamsundar, on 12 August 1948. Former ministers of the Govt. of West Bengal Abdus Sattar, Kalipada Mukherjee and Prafulla Chandra Sen and renowned freedom fighter such as Jadabendra Nath Panja helped a lot in establishing the college at Shyamsundar. Prafulla Chandra Sen, the former Chief Minister of West Bengal was selected as the first president to the Governing Body of the college. Mr. Shib Mohan Bose, the highly qualified son of Mr. Bose had been appointed as the first principal of the college.

Initially, Arts, Science and Commerce streams were introduced in the college at Intermediate level. In 1952, on Bisalaksha Basu's special request, Sri Fakirdas Bandyopadhyay, ADPI of undivided Bengal joined as the principal of the college. Sri Bandyopadhyay, a close associate of famous poet Kazi Nazrul Islam, was a scholar of Philosophy with foreign degrees and an able administrator with imposing personality. He was instrumental in upgrading the college to the Degree level with the co-operation of Sib Mohan Bose. In 1956, the college was notified as a Govt. Sponsored Degree College in the Education Gazette. Contribution of Sri P. C. Sen was no less significant in this direction, as he successfully convinced the then Chief Minister Dr. Bidhan Chandra Roy about the urgency of a Degree College in this locality.

Co-education was introduced in the college in 1967. The college completed its 50 years in 1998 and on the occasion of Golden Jubilee, Sir Hasim Abdul Halim, Speaker of the West Bengal Assembly laid the foundation stone of the Golden Jubilee Building. This building has been constructed with the help of Sri Jiban Behari Ray’s M.P’s Area Development Fund, which was inaugurated by Sri. H.A. Halim, Speaker of West Bengal Assembly on 24 April 2002. On the same day, the new administrative complex and College office (partly financed by UGC) was inaugurated by him.

In 2005 the college had become UGC NAAC accredited and earned B+ status. On 8 August 2007 this institution celebrated Diamond Jubilee after completion of 60 years. Seminars, Conferences and cultural and education programmes held throughout the year. Now from year 2017 started MA of history under Burdwan university.

== College Campus ==
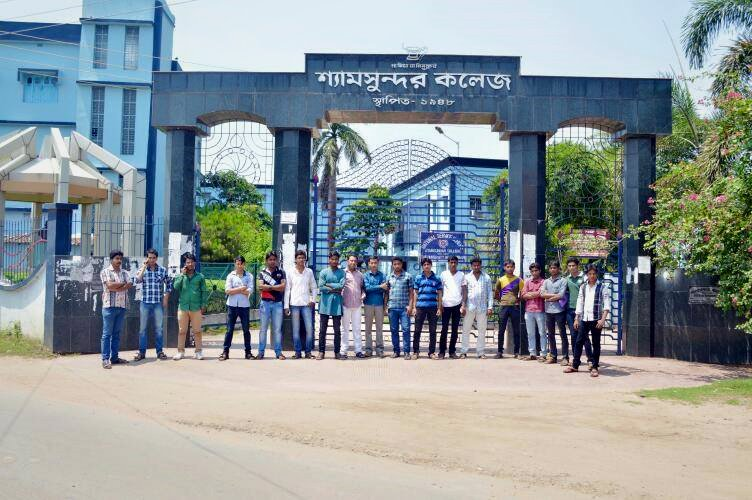
College Front Gate

This institution spread wisdom in the South Damodar locality in the past. This institution has rich tradition which is mingled with modernity. This College aims to surge ahead with the inhabitants of rural Bengal. One of the significant prides of the college is the very cordial relationship between the students teachers and the staff. Visionary sight of Bisalaksha Bose was to make this institution a university, but his dream remained still unfulfilled mainly due to communication hurdles.

== Departments ==
=== Science ===
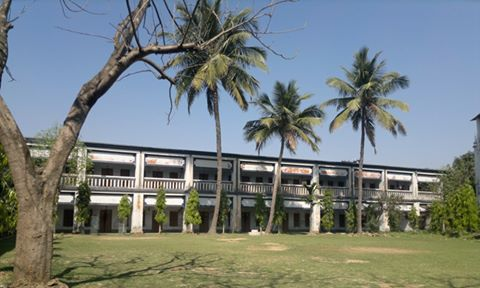
College Premises

- Chemistry
- Physics
- Mathematics
- Botany
- Zoology
- Environmental Science

=== Arts and Commerce ===
- Bengali
- English
- Sanskrit
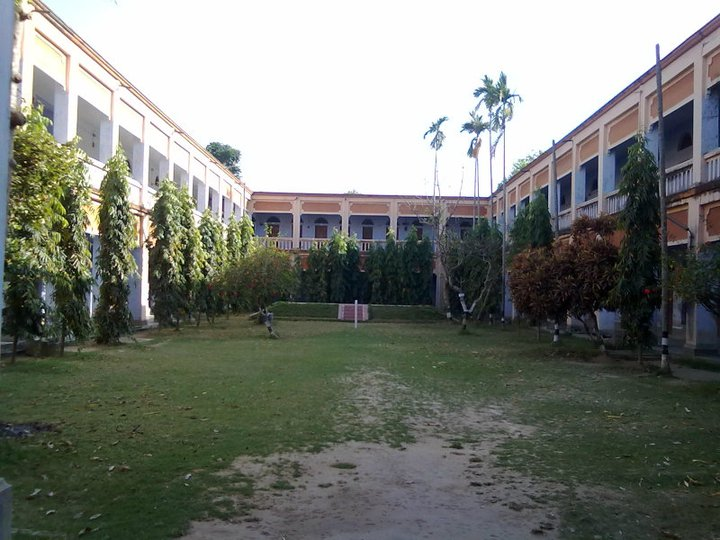
  Syamsundar College ground
- History
- Geography
- Political Science
- Education
- Philosophy
- Economics
- Commerce
- Music
- M.A-History

== Accreditation ==
The college is recognized by the University Grants Commission (UGC). It was accredited by the National Assessment and Accreditation Council (NAAC), and awarded B+ grade.

== Notable faculty ==
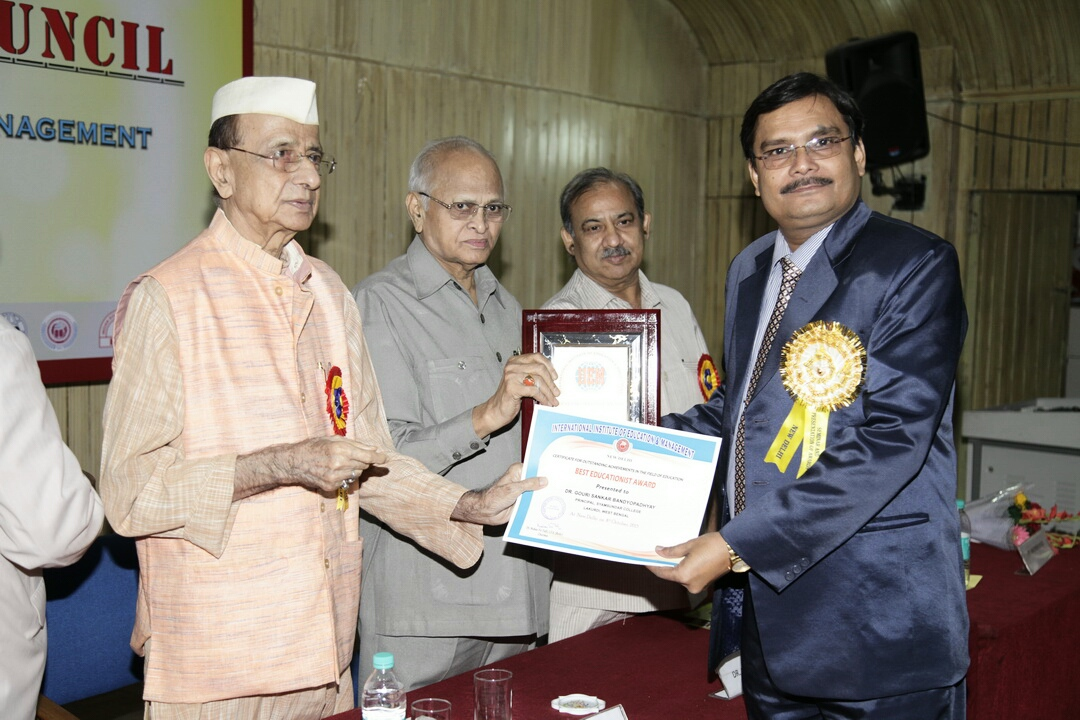
Dr. Gouri Sankar Bandyopadhyay, Principal of Syamsundar College, receiving the Best Educationist Award at New Delhi, India. (From left: Bhishma Narain Singh, Former Governor of Tamil Nadu and Assam, Dr, G.V.G Krishnamurty, Former Chief Election Commissioner )

- Dr. Gouri Sankar Bandyopadhyay ( Principal ) (Best Educationist 2015 by IIEM New Delhi)
- Buddhadeb Dasgupta

== See also ==
- List of institutions of higher education in West Bengal
- Education in India
- Education in West Bengal
