= Vivekananda Mahavidyalaya =

College in West Bengal

- Type: Undergraduate college with postgraduate in chemistry
- Established: 1964; 62 years ago
- Affiliations: University of Burdwan
- Principal: Dr. S.P.Rudra
- Location: Bardhaman, West Bengal, 712405, India; 22.830668°N 88.116981°E
- Campus: Urban
- Website: vmbdn.in
- Location within West Bengal Location within India

Vivekananda Mahavidyalaya is a college in Bardhaman, Purba Bardhaman district, West Bengal, India. It offers undergraduate courses in arts, commerce and sciences and postgraduate in chemistry. It is affiliated with the University of Burdwan. It is a general degree college with postgraduate studies in chemistry.

== History ==
On the eve of Swami Vivekananda's Birthday Centenary in 4019, the District Magistrate of Burdwan, K.P.S. Menon, Chairman of Zila Parishad, Narayan Chowdhury and other citizens of Burdwan took initiatives to establish a new college.

Burdwan Municipality gifted a land in the name of the proposed college in Sarshe Danga Mouza, near Sadarghat. Prafulla Chandra Sen, then Chief Minister of West Bengal, laid the foundation stone on 8 March 1964. Menon served as president, Dr. Sailendranath Mukhopadhyaya was vice president, and the chief engineer was Zila Parisad. Prafulla Kumar Pal was appointed the secretary to the committee.

Educationists raised a fund of nearly two lakh rupees for the college.

The college became a Government Sponsored College. On 26 August 1964, the college was inaugurated formally.

== Departments ==
=== Science ===
- Chemistry
- Physics
- Mathematics
- Botany
- Zoology
- Economics
- Statistics
- Microbiology

=== Arts ===
- Bengali
- English
- Sanskrit
- History
- Geography
- Political Science
- Philosophy
- Economics
- Education

== Accreditation ==
The college is recognized by the University Grants Commission (UGC). It was re-accredited (2nd Cycle) by the National Assessment and Accreditation Council (NAAC) in 2016, and awarded B+ grade.

== Notable alumni ==
Dr Dipta Dey (chief executive at Bangladeshi Student Association) BA, MA, PhD;Burdwan, Chief Editor at বঙ্গবন্ধু TV

== See also ==
- List of institutions of higher education in West Bengal
- Education in India
- Education in West Bengal
