= Param Nath Bhaduri =

Indian agronomist

- Born: 21 August 1908; Kolkata, Bengal Presidency, British India (now West Bengal)
- Died: 31 December 1992 (aged 84); Kolkata, India
- Education: Presidency College University of Calcutta University of London
- Known for: Plant Cytogenetics, Rhizobium
- Scientific career
- Fields: Agricultural Science
- Workplaces: Indian Agricultural Research Institute, Pusa, Delhi

Parama Nath Bhaduri (21 August 1908 – 31 December 1992) was an Indian Bengali agricultural scientist. He was born on 21 August 1908. After graduating from Presidency College, he completed his Master of Science (M.Sc) in Botany from the University of Calcutta in 1931. In 1939, he earned a Doctor of Philosophy (Ph.D.) degree from the University of London.

== Professional life ==
Parma Nath Bhaduri was appointed as a lecturer in botany at the University of Calcutta in 1942. In 1944, he was elected a Fellow of the Indian National Science Academy and served as a member from 1964 to 1966. In 1948, he joined the Indian Agricultural Research Institute in Pusa, New Delhi. He developed the method of 'Nucleolus Differential Staining'. Using this method, he worked on plant cell reproduction, specifically 'Plant Cytogenetics'. Later, in 1958, he rejoined the University of Calcutta and became the head of the Department of Botany. In 1964, he joined Burdwan University as a senior professor of botany and eventually was appointed as the vice-chancellor. After retiring in 1973, Dr. Bhaduri was appointed as an emeritus scientist under the Indian Council of Agricultural Research (ICAR) and joined Bidhan Chandra Krishi Viswavidyalaya (Agricultural University). He was an active member of the Indian National Science Academy from 1964 to 1966.

== Honours ==
Bhaduri was awarded the Paul Johannes Bruhl Memorial Medal by the Asiatic Society. He was also a Fellow of the Royal Horticultural Society of London.

== Death ==
He died on 31 December 1992, in Kolkata.
