= Balaram Mukhopadhyay =

Indian chemist

Balaram Mukhopadhyay (Bengali: বলরাম মুখোপাধ্যায়; born 12 January 1973) is an Indian Bengali carbohydrate chemist and a professor of the Indian Institute of Science Education and Research, Kolkata. Balaram is mainly known for his work in the field of synthetic carbohydrate chemistry. He was given the Excellence in Carbohydrate Research Award by the Association of Carbohydrate Chemists and Technologists India (ACCTI) in 2018 for his contribution towards field of carbohydrates.

== Biography and career ==
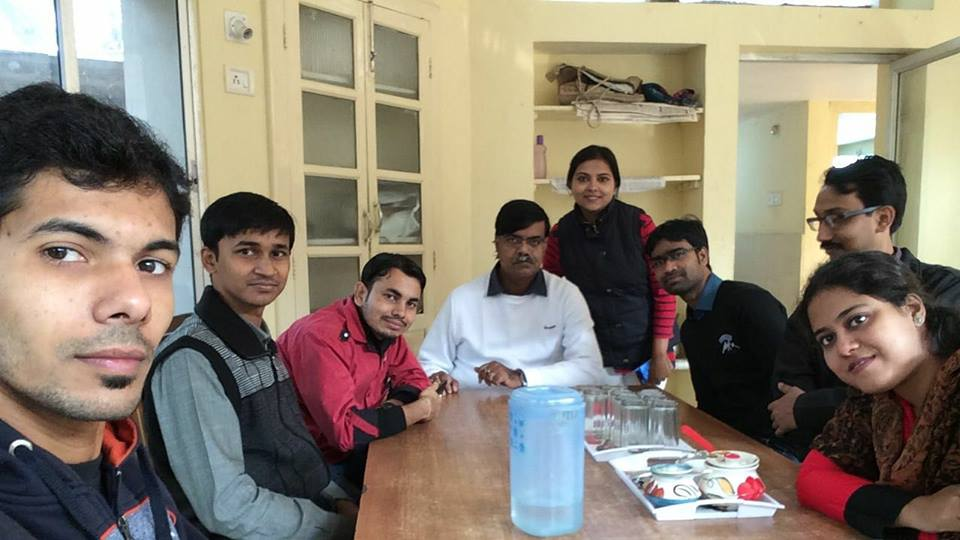
Mukhopadhyay and coworkers

Mukhopadhyay, born on 12 January 1973, in Bankura in the Indian state West Bengal, graduated with honours in chemistry from the Bankura Christian College in 1994 and followed it up with a master's degree from the Burdwan university in 1996. His journey with the world of carbohydrates is started when he enrolled for doctoral studies at the Indian Association For The Cultivation Of Science (IACS), Kolkata, under the guidance of Prof. Nirmolendu Roy and after securing a Ph.D. in 2001, he moved to the UK for the post-doctoral studies, under the supervision of Robert A Field of the University of East Anglia, Norwich, UK (2001–2005). After 4 years of Post-doctoral studies, Balaram joined as a Scientist-C at the Medicinal and Process Chemistry Division in Central Drug Research Institute (CDRI), Lucknow. He left CDRI at 2008 and joined as an assistant professor at Indian Institute of Science Education and Research, Kolkata (IISER Kolkata), where he now holds a position as a professor. At IISER, he heads a laboratory named Sweet Lab, where he hosts several researchers.

Balaram focuses his research mainly in oligosaccharide synthesis and published a number of articles. Later he also explored the fields like Glyco-nanoparticles, Supramolecular chemistry of carbohydrate gels and crystals, Carbohydrate protein interaction.

He became a member of the editorial board of the international peer-reviewed scientific journal Carbohydrate Research in 2017.

== Research Interest ==
The prime research focus of Balaram is to develop strategies for the chemical synthesis of biologically relevant oligosaccharides from bacterial or plant origin. He and his group synthesized several bacterial O-antigen repeating units of E. Coli, Shigella, Salmonella and Pseudomonas to name a few. En route to the total synthesis of this complex oligosaccharides, he along with his group is developing methodologies for the rational protecting group manipulations to prepare suitable monosaccharides building blocks and stereo/regioselective glycosylation. Depending on the carbohydrate-lectin interaction, Balaram's group is developing carbohydrate decorated multivalent dendrimers as lectin sensors. Also looking at the scopes of developing multifunctional gel materials through the supramolecular architecture of carbohydrate small molecules.

== Selected publications ==
1. Streamlined Synthesis of Per-O-acetylated Sugars, Glycosyl Iodides or Thioglycosides from Unprotected Sugars, Balaram Mukhopadhyay, K. P. R. Kartha, D. A. Russell and R. A. Field, Journal of Organic Chemistry 2004, 69, 7758–7760.
2. A one-pot synthesis of novel sugar derived 5,6-dihydro-quinazolino[4,3-b]quinazolin-8-ones: an entry towards highly functionalized sugar-heterocyclic hybrids: Abhijeet Deb Roy, Arunachalam Subramanian, Balaram Mukhopadhyay, Raja Roy, Tetrahedron Letters 2006, 47, 6857–6860.
3. Glycosylated N-sulfonylamidines: Highly efficient copper catalyzed multicomponent reaction with sugar alkynes, sulfonyl azides and amines: Santanu Mandal, Harsh Mohan Gauniyal, Kausikisankar Pramanik, Balaram Mukhopadhyay, Journal of Organic Chemistry 2007, 72, 9753–9756.
4. Chemical O-glycosylations: an overview: Rituparna Das and Balaram Mukhopadhyay, ChemistryOPEN 2016, 5, 401–433.
5. Synthesis and evaluation of iminocoumaryl and coumaryl derivatized glycosides as galectin antagonists: Vishal Kumar Rajput, Hakon Leffler, Ulf J. Nilsson and Balaram Mukhopadhyay, Bioorganic & Medicinal Chemistry Letters 2014, 24, 3516–3520.

== Book chapters ==
1. Iodine monobromide - update. R. A. Field and B. Mukhopadhyay in Encyclopedia of Reagents in Organic Synthesis, L. Paquette, P. Fuchs, D. Crich and P. Wipf Eds., John Wiley and Sons Ltd, 2004.
2. Synthetic Glycans, Glycoarrays, and Glyconanoparticles To Investigate Host Infection by Trypanosoma cruzi Robert A. Field, Peterson Andrade, Vanessa L. Campo, Ivone Carvalho, Beatrice Y. M. Collet, Paul R. Crocker, Margherita Fais, Rositsa Karamanska, Balaram Mukhopadhayay, Sergey A. Nepogodiev, Abdul Rashid, Martin Rejzek, David A. Russell, Claire L. Schofield, and Renate M. van Well, ACS Symposium Series, Chapter 9, 2011, pp 143–159.

== Awards ==
1. ACCTI Dr. H.C. Srivastava Memorial Award 2017 given by Association of Carbohydrate Chemists and Technologists India (ACCTI).
2. Excellence in Carbohydrates Research Award 2018 given by Association of Carbohydrate Chemists and Technologists India (ACCTI)
