= Sudip Chattopadhyay =

Indian biologist and biotechnologist

- Born: 1 August 1960 (age 66); West Bengal, India
- Education: University of Burdwan; University of Kalyani; Rajabazar Science College/ Calcutta University; Bose Institute; University of Michigan; Yale University; Purdue University
- Known for: Studies in signal transduction in plants
- Awards: 2005 N-BIOS Prize
- Scientific career
- Fields: Developmental biology
- Workplaces: National Institute of Plant Genome Research; National Institute of Technology, Durgapur
- Doctoral advisor: Sudhamoy Ghosh

Sudip Chattopadhyay (born 1 August 1960) is an Indian developmental biologist, biotechnologist and the dean of research and consultancy at the National Institute of Technology, Durgapur. Known for his studies on the molecular basis of light-controlled plant growth and development, Chattopadhyay is a J. C. Bose National Fellow of the Science and Engineering Research Board (SERB) and an elected fellow of all the three major Indian science academies namely Indian National Science Academy, Indian Academy of Sciences and National Academy of Sciences, India. The Department of Biotechnology of the Government of India awarded him the National Bioscience Award for Career Development, one of the highest Indian science awards, for his contributions to biosciences in 2005.

== Biography ==
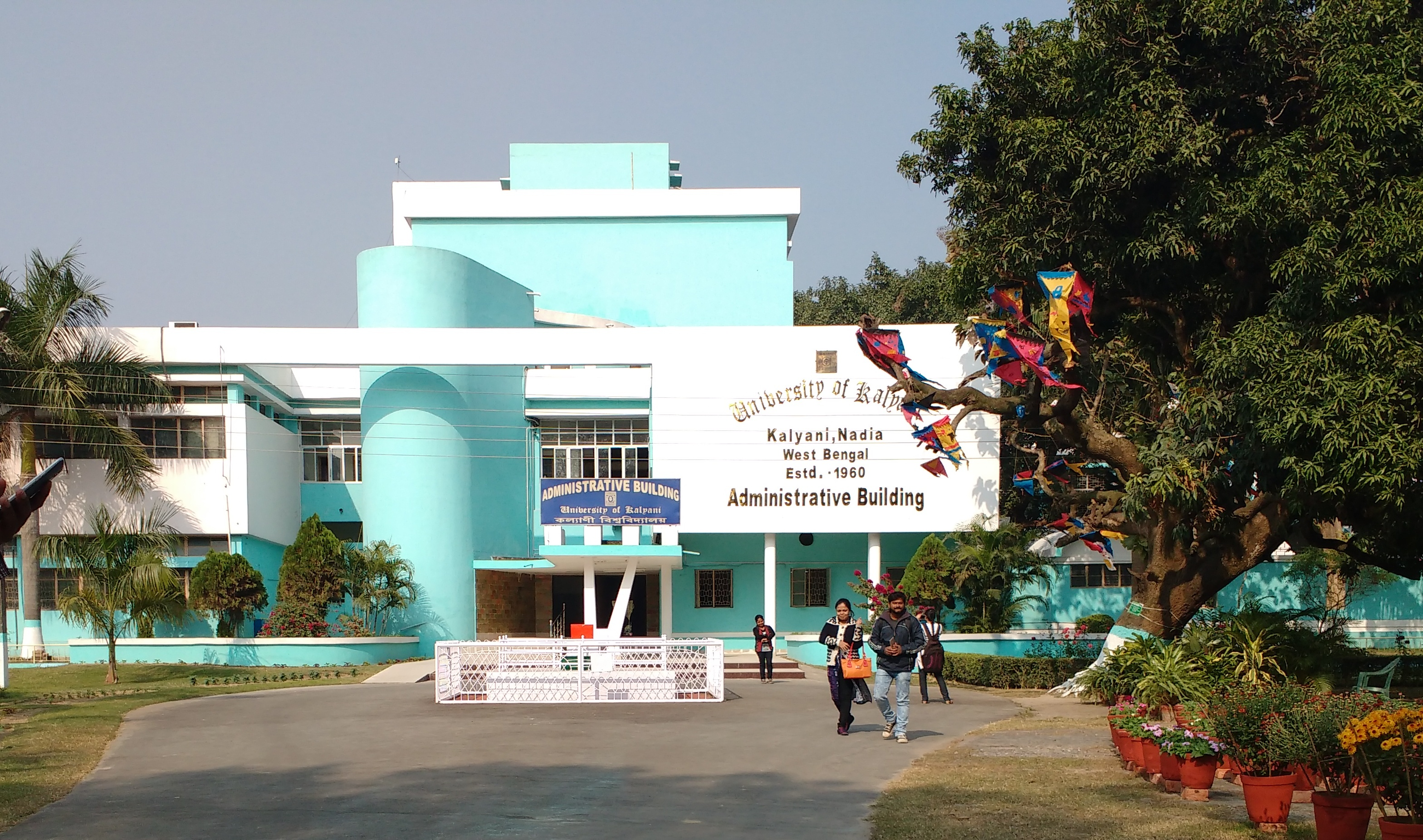
Kalyani University administrative building

Born on 1 August 1960 in the Indian state of West Bengal, Sudip Chattopadhyay completed a BSc honors degree in chemistry from the University of Burdwan and obtained an MSc in biochemistry from the University of Kalyani in 1986. Subsequently, he did his doctoral studies on the role of regulatory genes involved in carbohydrate metabolism at the Bose Institute under the guidance of Sudhamoy Ghosh which earned him a PhD from the University of Calcutta. Moving to the US in 1993, he joined the University of Michigan as a research associate but later shifted to Yale University and Purdue University where he completed the post-doctoral work. Returning to India in 2000, he joined the National Institute of Plant Genome Research, New Delhi as a professor. He was holding the grade of staff scientist IV when he joined the National Institute of Technology, Durgapur in 2009 as a professor where he serves as a professor at the department of biotechnology and as the dean of research and consultancy.

Chattopadhyay resides in Salt Lake City, a satellite town in West Bengal.

== Legacy ==
Transcription factors

During his post-doctoral years in the US, Chattopadhyay worked on the regulatory switch of seedling development in plant and propounded the theory that the first transcription factor of light signaling pathways which interacted with COP1 was HY5. Later, he studied the role of light in plant growth and development and its molecular basis. The team led by him was successful in synthesizing Z-box binding transcription factors such as ZBF1, ZBF2 and ZBF3 and regulatory proteins like SHW1 and EHY5, all of which have significant role in plant development from seedling stage to flowering. They have also been successful in demonstrating the correlation between Z-box binding factors and other transcription factors namely HY5, HYH, COP1 and SPA1. Their work has resulted in the generation of ZBF1 over-expresser transgenic tomato plants and investigations are on regarding the biotechnological potential of the findings in crop development. His studies have been documented by way of a number of articles (Note: Please see Selected bibliography section) and the online article repository of the Indian Academy of Sciences has listed 22 of them. He has mentored several doctoral scholars and has delivered invited or plenary speeches at seminars and conferences.

== Awards and honors ==
Chattopadhyay, who holds the J. C. Bose National Fellowship of the Science and Engineering Research Board, received the Merit Award of Kalyani University in 1986 for academic excellence. The Department of Biotechnology of the Government of India awarded him the National Bioscience Award for Career Development, one of the highest Indian science awards in 2005. The National Academy of Sciences, India elected him as a fellow in 2006 and he became a member of Guha Research Conference in 2007, the same year as he received the Ramanna fellowship of the Department of Science and Technology. He received the elected fellowships of the two academies in 2009, those of the Indian Academy of Sciences and the Indian National Science Academy. A year later, the West Bengal Academy of Science and Technology elected him as a fellow.

== Selected bibliography ==
- Babu Rajendra Prasad, V.; Gupta, Nisha; Nandi, Ashis; Chattopadhyay, Sudip (2012). "HY1 genetically interacts with GBF1 and regulates the activity of the Z-box containing promoters in light signaling pathways in Arabidopsis thaliana". Mechanisms of Development. 129 (9–12): 298–307. doi:10.1016/j.mod.2012.06.004. PMID 22766018.
- Mallappa, Chandrashekara; Singh, Aparna; Ram, Hathi; Chattopadhyay, Sudip (19 December 2008). "GBF1, a Transcription Factor of Blue Light Signaling in Arabidopsis, Is Degraded in the Dark by a Proteasome-mediated Pathway Independent of COP1 and SPA1". Journal of Biological Chemistry. 283 (51): 35772–35782. doi:10.1074/jbc.m803437200. ISSN 0021-9258. PMID 18930926.
- Mallappa, Chandrashekara; Yadav, Vandana; Negi, Prem; Chattopadhyay, Sudip (4 August 2006). "A Basic Leucine Zipper Transcription Factor, G-box-binding Factor 1, Regulates Blue Light-mediated Photomorphogenic Growth in Arabidopsis". Journal of Biological Chemistry. 281 (31): 22190–22199. doi:10.1074/jbc.m601172200. ISSN 0021-9258. PMID 16638747.
- Maurya JP, Sethi V, Gangappa SN, Gupta N, Chattopadhyay S. Interaction of MYC2 and GBF1 results in functional antagonism in blue light-mediated Arabidopsis seedling development. Plant J. 2015 Aug;83(3):439-50. https://doi.org/10.1111/tpj.12899
- Abbas N, Maurya JP, Senapati D, Gangappa SN, Chattopadhyay S. Arabidopsis CAM7 and HY5 physically interact and directly bind to the HY5 promoter to regulate its expression and thereby promote photomorphogenesis. Plant Cell. 2014 Mar;26(3):1036-52. https://doi.org/10.1105/tpc.113.122515

== See also ==
- Arabidopsis thaliana
- Photomorphogenesis
