= Amalendu Chandra =

Indian physical chemist, scientist and professor (born 1963)

- Born: 6 October 1963 (age 62); West Bengal, India
- Education: University of Burdwan; Indian Institute of Science; University of British Columbia
- Known for: Studies on microscopic theories and simulations
- Awards: 1995 INSA Young Scientist Medal; 1997 INSA Anil Kumar Bose Memorial Award; 2006 Shanti Swarup Bhatnagar Prize; 2006 CRSI Bronze Medal; 2015 CRSI Silver Medal
- Scientific career
- Fields: Theoretical physical chemistry
- Workplaces: IIT Kanpur

Amalendu Chandra (born 1963) is an Indian theoretical physical chemist, a professor and the head of the Department of Chemistry at the Indian Institute of Technology, Kanpur. He is known for his microscopic theories and simulations on liquids, interface and clusters. He is an elected fellow of the Indian Academy of Sciences and the Indian National Science Academy. The Council of Scientific and Industrial Research, the apex agency of the Government of India for scientific research, awarded him the Shanti Swarup Bhatnagar Prize for Science and Technology, one of the highest Indian science awards, in 2007, for his contributions to chemical sciences.

== Biography ==
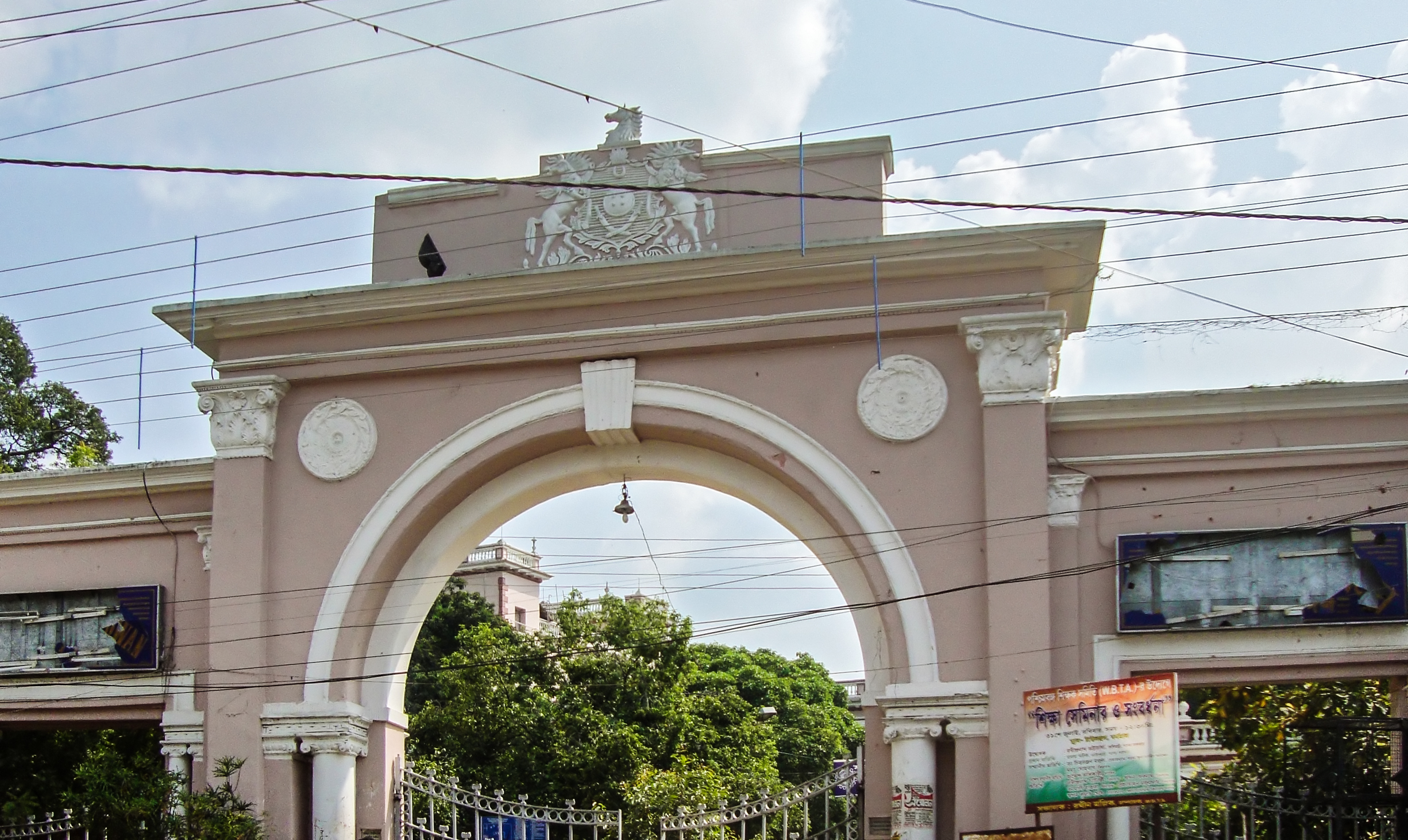
Burdwan University

Amalendu Chandra, born on 6 October 1963 in the Indian state of West Bengal, graduated in chemistry from the University of Burdwan in 1984 and completed his master's degree from the same university in 1986. His doctoral studies were at the Indian Institute of Science and after securing a PhD in 1991, he moved to Canada for his post-doctoral studies at the University of British Columbia on an Izaac Walton Killam Fellowship. On his return to India in 1993, he joined IIT Kanpur where he serves as a professor of the department of chemistry and also the head of the department. He held two chair professorships during this period viz. Rahul and Namita Gautam Chair Professorship (2008–11) and Sajani Kumar Roy Memorial Chair Professorship (2011). He is also associated with Biman Bagchi and assists the research group headed by the latter in their studies.

Chandra's researches are based on the simulations of liquids, interface and clusters and he is known to have contributed to develop microscopic theories and predictions. He has conducted reportedly extensive studies on the equilibrium and dynamical behaviour of complex molecular liquids and bulk ionic solutions as well as on the structure of molecular clusters using theoretical and computational methodologies. He has documented his researches in several peer-reviewed articles; ResearchGate, an online repository of scientific articles has listed 118 of them.

== Awards and honors ==
Chandra was selected by the Indian Academy of Sciences in 1993 as an associate of the academy with the tenure running from 1994 to 1998. In 1995, the Indian National Science Academy awarded him the Young Scientist Medal and followed it up with the Anil Kumar Bose Memorial Award in 1997. He received the Bronze Medal of the Chemical Research Society of India in 2006; the society would honor him again 2015 with the silver medal. The Council of Scientific and Industrial Research awarded him the Shanti Swarup Bhatnagar Prize, one of the highest Indian science awards, in 2007. He was elected as a fellow by the Indian Academy of Sciences in 2009 and he became an elected fellow of the Indian National Science Academy in 2015. He has held several other research fellowships including the Alexander von Humboldt Fellowship (2002–03) and the Ramanna Fellowship (2006–09 and 2010–13), and J. C. Bose National Fellowship of the Department of Science and Technology (2013).

== See also ==
- Molecular clusters
- Biman Bagchi
