= Sankar Kumar Nath =

Indian geophysicist and seismologist

Dr. Sankar Kumar Nath

Vice Chancellor of The University of Burdwan
- Incumbent
- Assumed office 7 December 2024
- Preceded by: Goutam Chandra

Personal details
- Born: January 3, 1960 (age 66) West Bengal, India
- Relatives
- Scientific career
- Education: IIT Kharagpur; Geophysical Institute
- Known for: Geotomographical studies
- Awards: 1999 MoM National Mineral Award; 2002 S. S. Bhatnagar Prize; 2003 IIFS Bharat Jyoti Award; 2004 SGAT Award of Excellence; 2004 UGC Homi J. Bhabha National Award; 2005 Dr. J. Coggin Brown Memorial Gold Medal
- Fields: Climatology; Atmospheric modeling
- Workplaces: University of Burdwan; IIT Kharagpur; Indicos Computer Services; Oil India; Computech Ispat; University of Alaska Fairbanks
- Doctoral advisor: Niren N. Biswas

Dr. Sankar Kumar Nath (born 3 January 1960) is an Indian geophysicist, seismologist and the vice chancellor of the University of Burdwan. He was previously a senior professor at the Indian Institute of Technology Kharagpur. He is known for his geotomographical studies and is an elected fellow of the Indian National Academy of Engineering, Indian Geophysical Union and the National Academy of Sciences, India, The Council of Scientific and Industrial Research, the apex agency of the Government of India for scientific research, awarded him the Shanti Swarup Bhatnagar Prize for Science and Technology, one of the highest Indian science awards for his contributions to Earth, Atmosphere, Ocean and Planetary Sciences in 2002. (Note: Long link - please select award year to see details)

== Biography ==
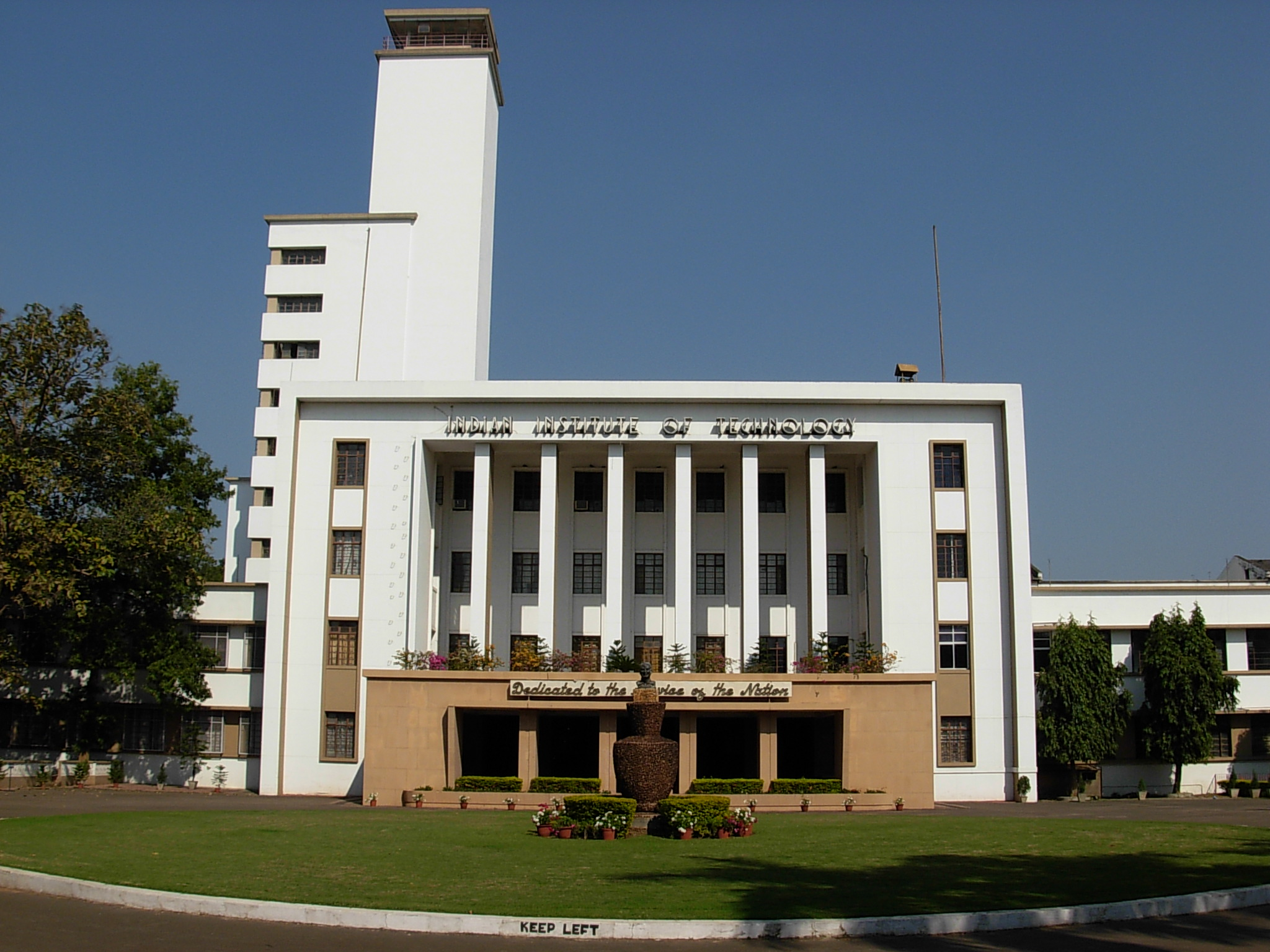
IIT Kharagpur

S. K. Nath, born on 3 January 1960 in the Indian state of West Bengal, graduated in geology (BSc hons) in 1979 from the Indian Institute of Technology Kharagpur and completed his master's degree in exploration geophysics from the same institution in 1981, passing both the examinations with first rank; his thesis for the master's degree earned him a Silver Medal for the best thesis. After working as a CSIR junior research fellow at IIT Kharagpur for 6 months, he started his career as a junior geophysicist with Indicos Computer Services, a Mumbai-based firm, in 1982. Two years later, he moved to Oil India station in Assam where he worked as a geoscientist and senior geoscientist till 1988. Returning to his home state in January that year, he had a short stint of 7 months at Computech Ispat, Kolkata as the processing manager before enrolling for doctoral studies at IIT Kharagpur, simultaneously working as a lecturer. During this period, he secured a PhD in seismic prospecting in 1993 and did his post-doctoral studies on earthquake seismology at the Geophysical Institute of the University of Alaska Fairbanks during 1995–96 at the laboratory of Niren N. Biswas. On his return to India in 1996, he resumed his service at IIT Kharagpur and served in various capacities as an assistant professor, associate professor and professor before becoming the head of the department of geology and geophysics in 2003 and held the post till 2006. He also had a second stint at University of Alaska Fairbanks as a visiting scientist during 1998–2003. He continued his association with IIT Kharagpur as a senior professor till November 2024 before got appointed as the VC of Burdwan University.

== Legacy ==
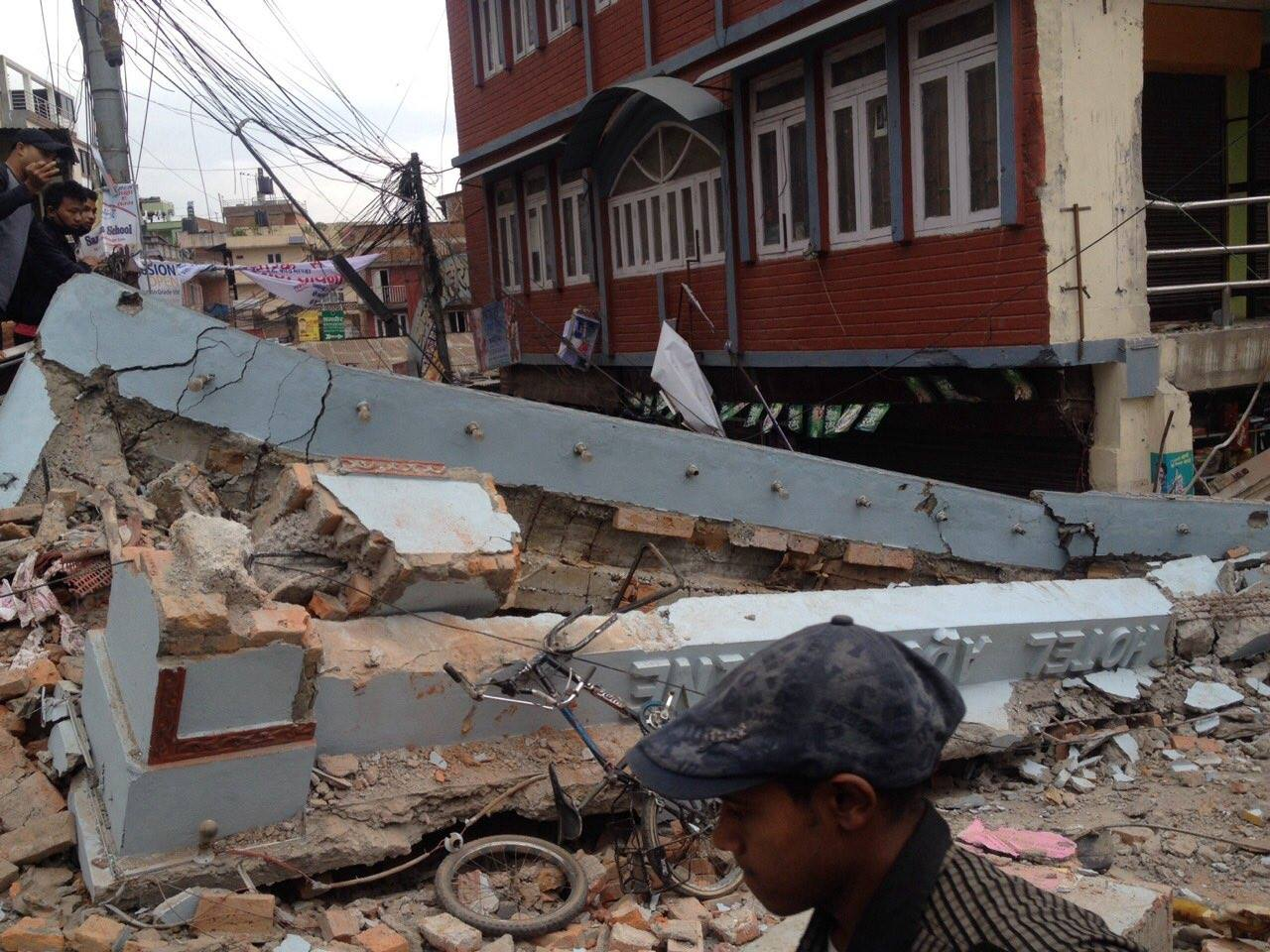
Nepal Earthquake 2015

Nath is known to have studied the seismic activities in the Himalayan region including the earthquakes in Nepal in April and May 2015 and has contributed to developing novel applications of geotomography. He has been involved in a number of government-sponsored project studies which included Seismic Hazard Microzonation and Evaluation of Vulnerability & Risk of Sikkim Himalaya, Guwahati Megacity, Urban Kolkata and Kashmir Valley project of the Ministry of Earth Sciences, National Programme in Earthquake Engineering Education in India of the Ministry of Human Resource Development, National Programme for Capacity Building of Engineers in Earthquake Risk Management of the Ministry of Home Affairs and the National Earthquake Risk Mitigation Programme of the National Disaster Management Authority. His studies have been documented in several peer-reviewed articles; (Note: Please see Selected bibliography section) Google Scholar and ResearchGate, online repositories of scientific articles, have listed 122 and 93 of them respectively. He is the author of the Seismic Microzonation Manual and Seismic Microzonation Handbook published by the Ministry of Earth Sciences and the editor of Training Handbook for the Faculty of the State Resource Institutions, a reference manual for capacity building in earthquake risk management published by the Ministry of Home Affairs, the former two are prescribed texts for academic education in India. Besides, he is the author of Schlumberger Geoelectric Sounding in Gro, a text explaining the application of Vertical Electrical Sounding (VES) curves in explorational geophysics. Nath, who has delivered several keynote and plenary addresses at seminars and conferences in India and abroad, is also credited with contributions in the establishment of a strong motion network 16 earthquake monitoring stations in the Himalayan region and two broadband seismological observatories at the Kharagpur and Kolkata campuses of IIT Kharagpur.

== Awards and honors ==
S. K. Nath received the National Mineral Award of the Ministry of Mines in 1999 and the Council of Scientific and Industrial Research awarded him the Shanti Swarup Bhatnagar Prize, one of the highest Indian science awards in 2002. The Bharat Jyoti Award of the India International Friendship Society reached him in 2003 and he received two awards in 2004 viz. SGAT Award of Excellence of the Society of Geoscientists and Allied Technologists and Homi J. Bhabha Award for Applied Sciences of Hari OM Ashram Trust and the University Grants Commission of India. These were followed by the Dr. J. Coggin Brown Memorial Gold Medal which he received in 2005. He is an elected fellow of the Indian Geophysical Union, the National Academy of Sciences, India and the Indian National Academy of Engineering and a life member of the Society of Geoscientists and Allied Technologists.

== Selected bibliography ==
=== Books ===
- Sankar Kumar Nath, Hari Pada Patra (1999). Schlumberger Geoelectric Sounding in Gro. CRC Press. p. 160. ISBN 978-9054107897.
- S. K. Nath (2011). "Seismic Microzonation Manual". Ministry of Earth Sciences.
- S. K. Nath (2011). "Seismic Microzonation Handbook". Ministry of Earth Sciences.
- S. K. Nath (editor). "Training Handbook for the Faculty of the State Resource Institutions". Training manual. Ministry of Home Affairs. ;

=== Articles ===
- Nath, S. K., Roy, D. and Thingbaijam, K. K. S. (2008). "Disaster mitigation and management for West Bengal, India An appraisal". Curr. Sci. 94 (7): 858–866.
- Nath, S. K., Shukla, K., Vyas M. J. (2008). "Seismic Hazard Scenario and Attenuation Model of the Garhwal Himalaya using Near Field Synthesis from Weak Motion Seismometry". J. Earth Syst. Sci. 117 (a): 649–670. Bibcode:2008JESS..117..649N. doi:10.1007/s12040-008-0062-6. S2CID 129921624.
- Sankar Kumar Nath, Kiran Kumar Singh Thingbaijam, Abhishek Raj (2008). "Earthquake Hazard in the Northeast India - A Seismic Microzonation Approach with Typical Case Studies from Sikkim Himalaya and Guwahati city". J. Earth Syst. Sci. 118 (S2): 809–831. Bibcode:2008JESS..117..809N. doi:10.1007/s12040-008-0070-6. S2CID 129013751.
- S. K. Nath, K. K. S. Thingbaijam (2009). "Seismic hazard assessment – a holistic microzonation approach". Nat. Hazards Earth Syst. Sci. 9 (4): 1445–1459. Bibcode:2009NHESS...9.1445N. doi:10.5194/nhess-9-1445-2009.
- S. K. Nath, A. Raj, K. K. S. Thingbaijam, A. Kumar (2009). "Ground Motion Synthesis and Seismic Scenario in Guwahati City—A Stochastic Approach". Seismological Research Letters. 80 (2): 233–242. Bibcode:2009SeiRL..80..233N. doi:10.1785/gssrl.80.2.233.

== See also ==
- Seismic microzonation
- Geology of the Himalaya
- Operation Sankat Mochan
- Operation Maitri
