= University of Burdwan =

Public University in West Bengal, India

- Seal of the University of Burdwan
- Other name: Burdwan University
- Motto: sā vidyā yā vimuktaye
- Motto in English: Learning Leads To Emancipation
- Type: Public research university
- Established: 15 June 1960 (66 years ago)
- Founders: Bidhan Chandra Roy; Uday Chand Mahtab
- Accreditation: NAAC
- Academic affiliations: UGC; AIU; AICTE
- Budget: ₹176.50 crore (US$18 million) (FY2026–27 est.)
- Chancellor: Governor of West Bengal
- Vice-Chancellor: Sankar Kumar Nath
- Faculty: 221 (2025)
- Students: 6,084 (2025)
- Undergraduates: 328 (2025)
- Postgraduates: 5,107 (2025)
- Doctoral students: 649 (2025)
- Location: Burdwan, West Bengal, India; 23°14′21″N 87°51′04″E
- Campus: Urban; 400 acres (160 ha) (Academic campus at Golapbag); 80 acres (32 ha) (Administrative campus at Rajbati)
- Acronym: BU
- Website: www.buruniv.ac.in

University of Burdwan (also known as Burdwan University or B. U.) is a public state research university located in Bardhaman, also known as Burdwan, in West Bengal, India. It was established by the West Bengal Government as a teaching and affiliating university on 15 June 1960 with six postgraduate departments and 30 undergraduate colleges spread over three districts that come under the jurisdiction of the university. The university currently offers more than 30 undergraduate and 66 postgraduate courses. It has grown as the second largest state university in West Bengal after University of Calcutta. Over the years, the University has consistently performed in the NIRF ranking by securing rank within top 100 under 'University' Category and occupied the rank of 89, 92, 85 and 87 in the years 2019, 2020, 2021 and 2022 respectively.

== History ==
The University of Burdwan was established on 15 June 1960, under the state university category of Government of West Bengal with Sukumar Sen ICS, an esteemed Indian Civil Services officer and the first Chief Election Commissioner of India, as its inaugural Vice-Chancellor. The university's foundation was significantly influenced by the abolition of the Zamindari system in the 1950s.Sir Uday Chand Mahtab Maharajadhiraja Bahadur, the last scion of the Burdwan Raj, exhibited extraordinary generosity by bequeathing almost the entirety of his ancestral estate to the state government. This, combined with the visionary efforts of the then Chief Minister of West Bengal, Dr. Bidhan Chandra Roy, paved the way for the establishment of this prestigious institution. Today, administrative functions are primarily conducted at the Rajbati campus, the former palace of the Barddhaman Maharaja, while academic activities predominantly take place at the Golapbag campus.

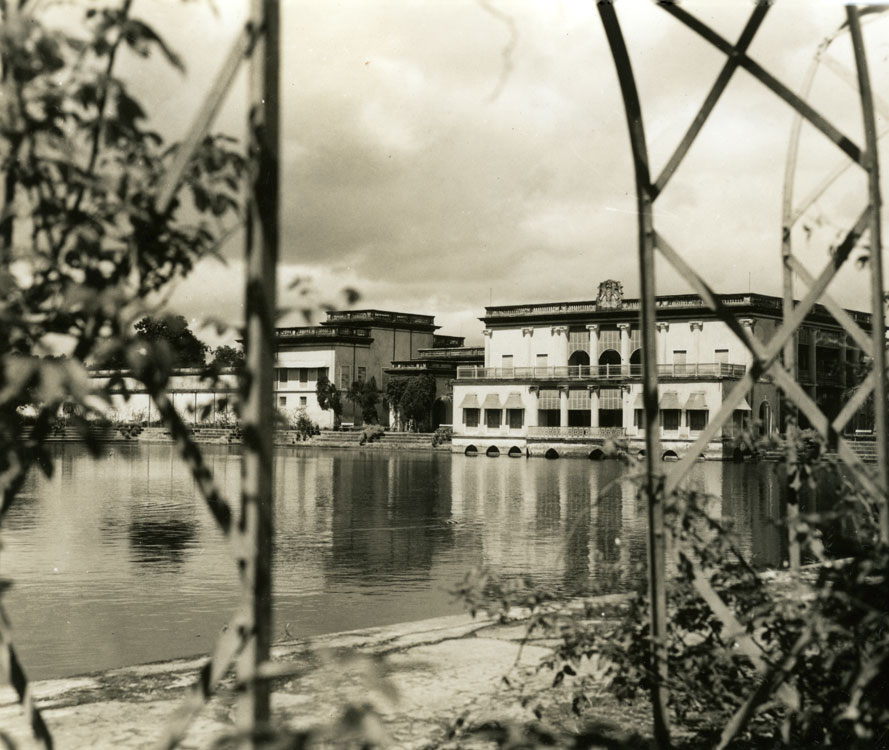
Palace of the Maharajah in 1944

In its nascent stage, the university commenced operations with a focus on the humanities. A year later, the science faculties were introduced, aligning with the university's original vision of fostering a bias towards science and technology to meet the industrial demands of the time. This vision was further realised with the establishment of the Burdwan Medical College and the Regional Engineering College in Durgapur. Presently, the university boasts around 22 postgraduate departments across various disciplines. Notably, the University Institute of Technology (UIT), recently established under the university's direct control, has received approval from the All India Council for Technical Education (AICTE), after the establishment of National Institute of Technology, Durgapur replacing the REC Durgapur.

The university offers a diverse array of courses, including those in physical education, B.Ed., foreign languages, computer applications, and population education. Additionally, the university is home to an Adult Continuing Education Centre and an Academic Staff College. Rajbati, the university's administrative centre, houses a museum and art gallery, showcasing artefacts that include pottery from prehistoric times.

The university's Distance Education wing offers postgraduate education in various subjects and professional undergraduate courses. With a strong sense of social responsibility, the university has actively supported the establishment of the Meghnad Saha Planetarium and a Science Centre. Moreover, the university has founded a Rural Technology Centre, named after Shri Binoy Krishna Choudhury, a former West Bengal government minister, to provide vocational training and create self-employment opportunities for rural youth. Future plans include the development of a centre for creative arts.

== Campuses ==
The University of Burdwan has multiple campuses spread across Bardhaman. These campuses house various academic departments, research centers, and administrative offices.

=== Golapbag Campus ===
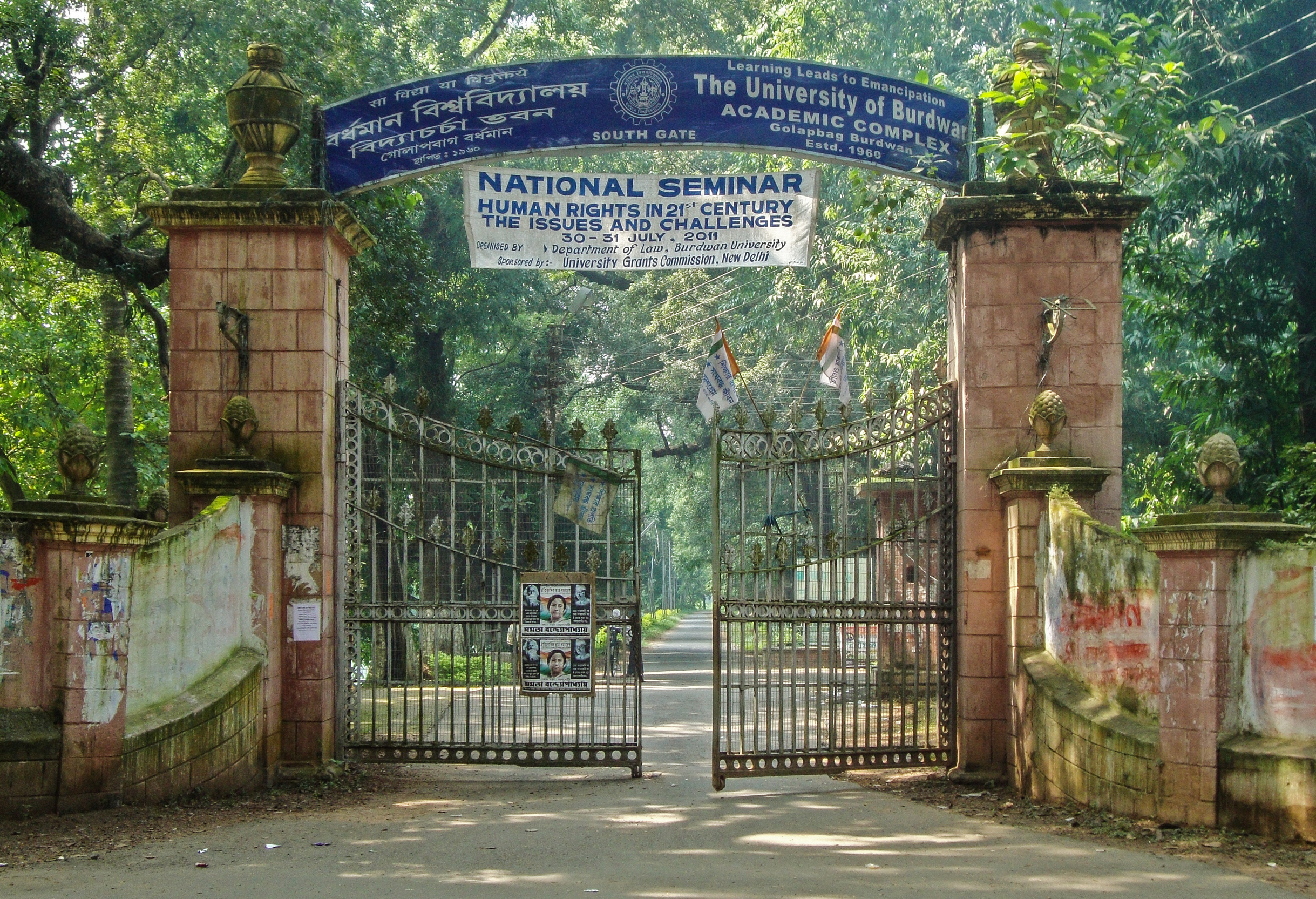
B.U. Golapbag Campus south gate

The Golapbag Campus is the university's primary academic hub, spread across a vast area with lush greenery. It houses various science, humanities, engineering, and technology departments. Several research laboratories and academic buildings are located here. The University Institute of Technology, offering undergraduate and postgraduate programs in engineering, is situated within this campus.

=== Rajbati Campus ===
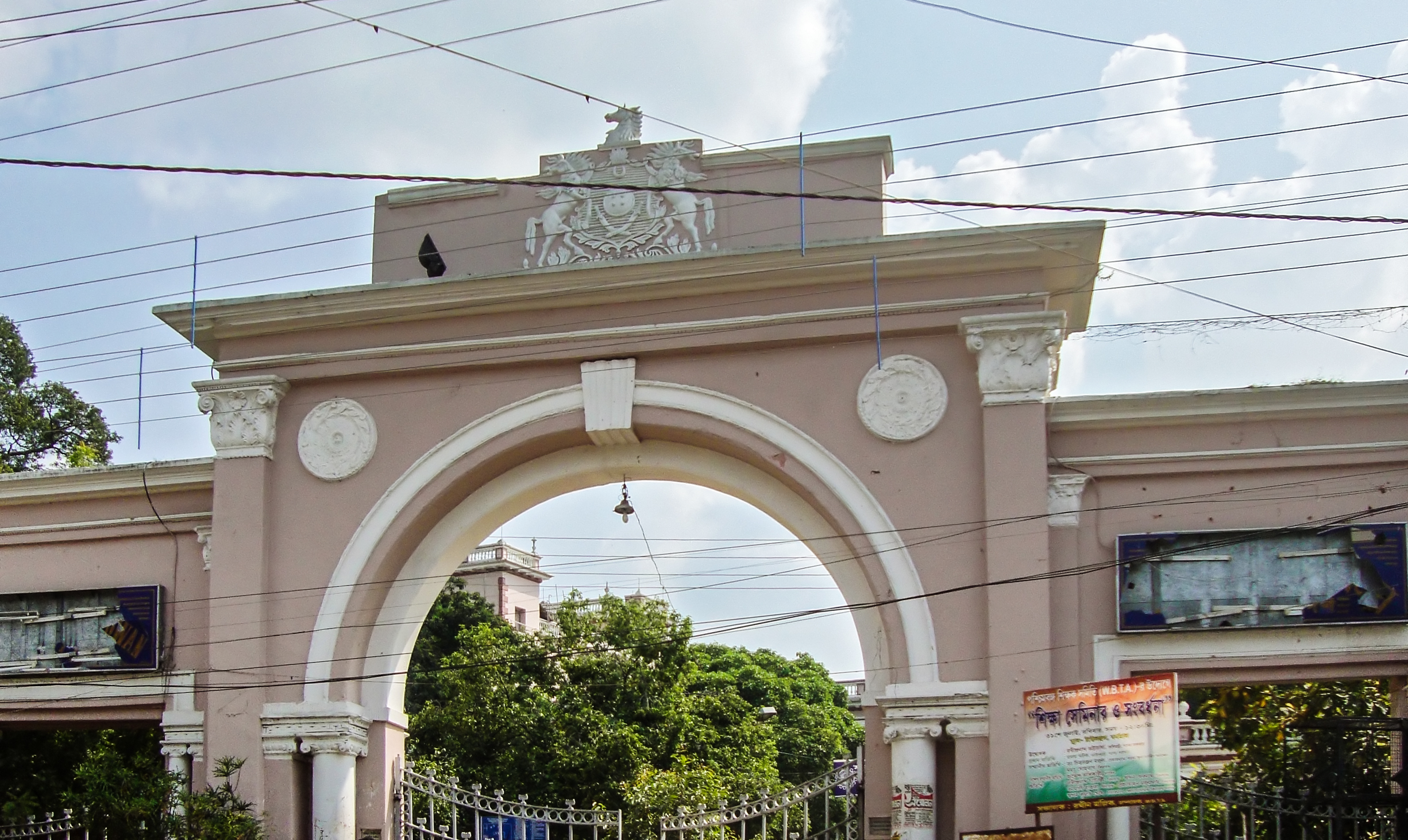
B.U. administrative complex gate, Rajbati Campus

The Rajbati Campus is the administrative headquarters of the university. It is located near the Bardhaman Railway Station. This campus includes the Vice-Chancellor's Secretariat, the Registrar's Office, and central administrative units. It also houses the University Central Library and several research centers. The campus features heritage buildings from the colonial era.

=== Tara Bag Campus ===
The Tara Bag Campus primarily focuses on business and management studies. It accommodates the School of Management along with seminar and conference halls. The campus has girls hostels and quarters of the teaching and non teaching staff. Here also has a university guest house.

=== Facilities ===
The university provides various facilities for students and staff. The University Health Centre offers medical services. The Central Library has an extensive collection of books, journals, and digital resources. The Sports Complex includes facilities for athletics and student recreation.

Map of Burdwan University campuses

== Organisation and administration ==
=== Governance ===
Burdwan University is an autonomous state university, with the Governor of West Bengal serving as its Chancellor. The daily administration of the university is overseen by the Vice-Chancellor, who is appointed by the Governor based on the recommendations of the state government. The Vice-Chancellor is supported in this role by the Pro Vice-Chancellor, typically a senior faculty member and also for the Faculty of Engineering and Technology.

Administrative Council of Burdwan University
Rank	Position	Current office holder(s)
1	Chancellor	R. N. Ravi
2	Vice Chancellor	Sankar Kumar Nath
3	Pro-Vice Chancellor	Vacant
4	Registrar	Dr. Arijit Chatterjee
5	Controller of Examination	Dr. Anindya Jyoti Pal
6	Financial Officer	Dr. Sougata Chakrabarti
7	Dean (Engineering & Technology)	Abhijit Mazumdar
8	Dean (Science)	Abhijit Mazumdar
9	Dean (Arts, Commerce, Law, MBA, Fine Arts & Music)	Partha Pratim Das
10	The President of WBCHSE	Mosiur Rahaman
11	The President of WBBSE	Vacant
12	The President of WBBME	Md. Fazle Rabbi
13	The Chairperson of UGC	Vineet Joshi, IAS
14	The Chairperson of NCTE	Pankaj Arora
15	AICTE Nominated	V. R. Desai, IIT-KGP
16	Principal of UIT	Sunil Karforma
17	Head of the Departments (HoD)	Various
18	Principal of Affiliated Colleges	Various

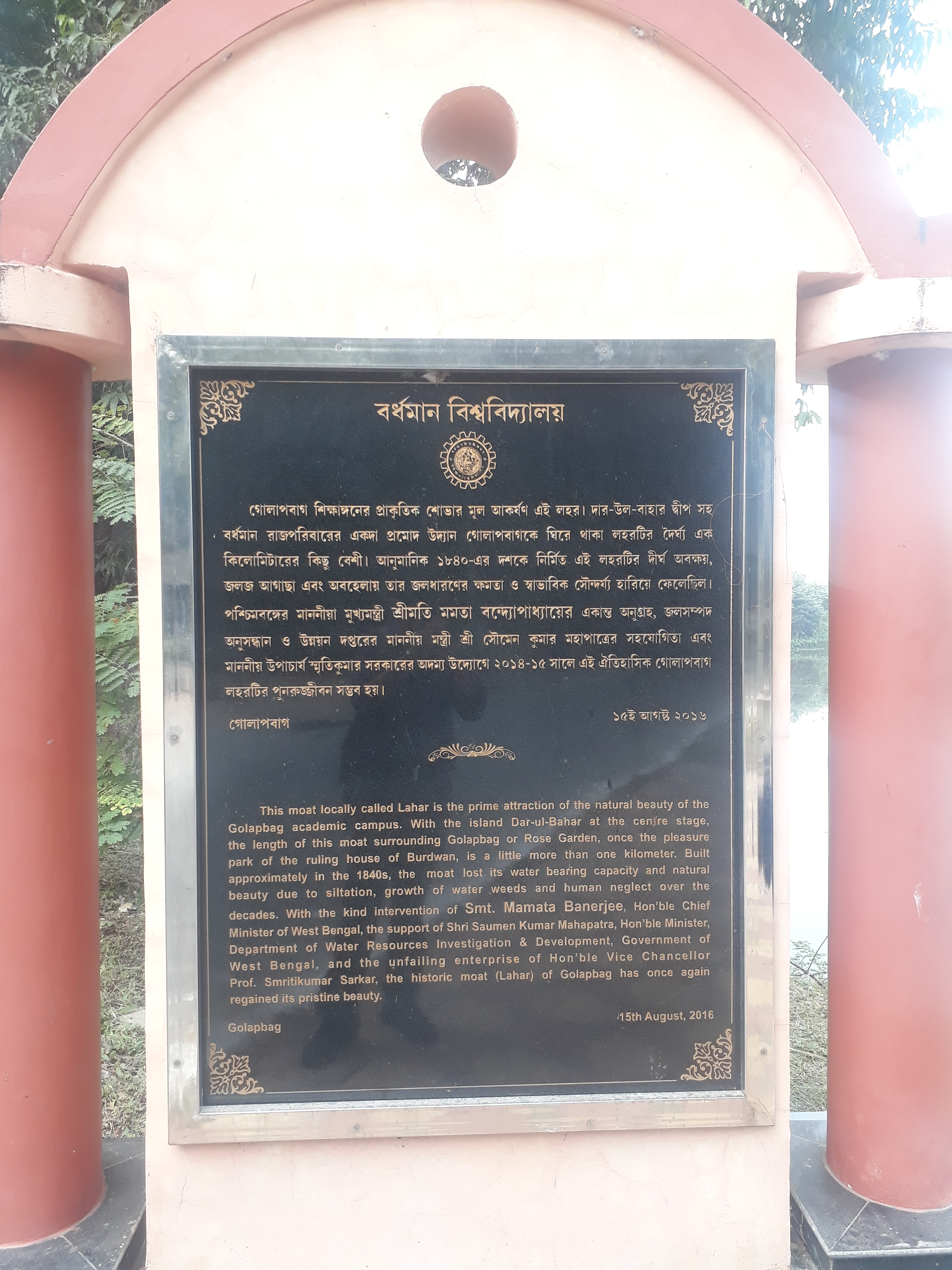
Burdwan University campus and buildings at Bardhaman, Golapbag, Purba Bardhaman

List of All Vice-Chancellors
No.	Name
1.	Sukumar Sen, ICS
2.	Braja Kanta Guha, ICS
3.	Dr. Dhirendra Mohan Sen
4.	Param Nath Bhaduri
5.	Ramaranjan Mukherji
6.	Shashi Bhusan Choudhury
7.	Ramaranjan Mukherjee
8.	Birendra Nath Goswami
9.	Shankari Prosad Banerjee
10.	Mohit Bhattacharya
11.	Dilip Kumar Basu
12.	Amit Kumar Mallik
13.	Subrata Pal
14.	Dr. Shoroshimohan Dan
15.	Smriti Kumar Sarkar
16.	Nimai Chandra Saha
17.	Biswajit Ghosh
18.	Goutam Chandra
19.	Sankar Kumar Nath (Incumbent)

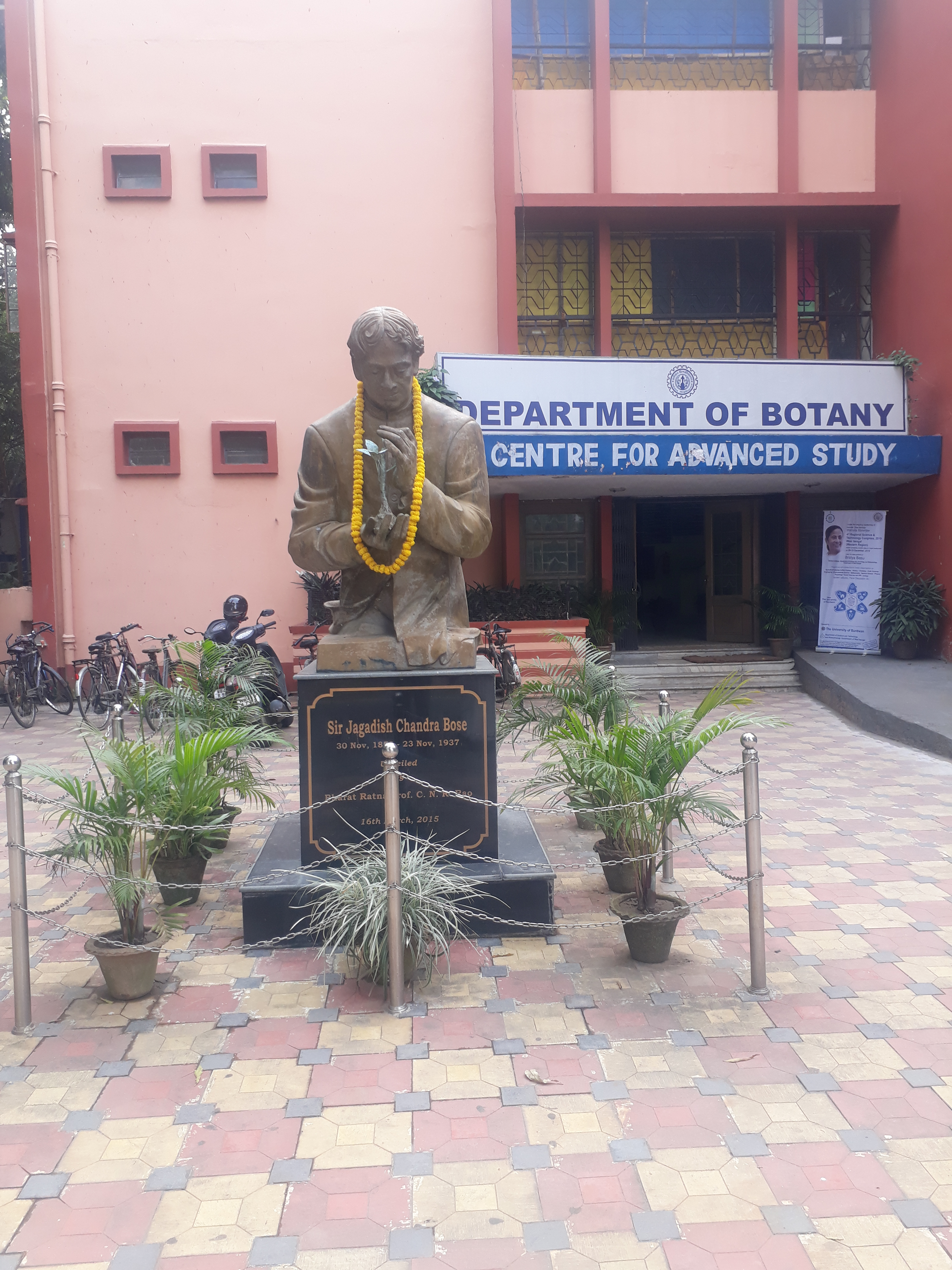
Department of Botany, Burdwan University campus at Golapbag, Bardhaman, Purba Bardhaman

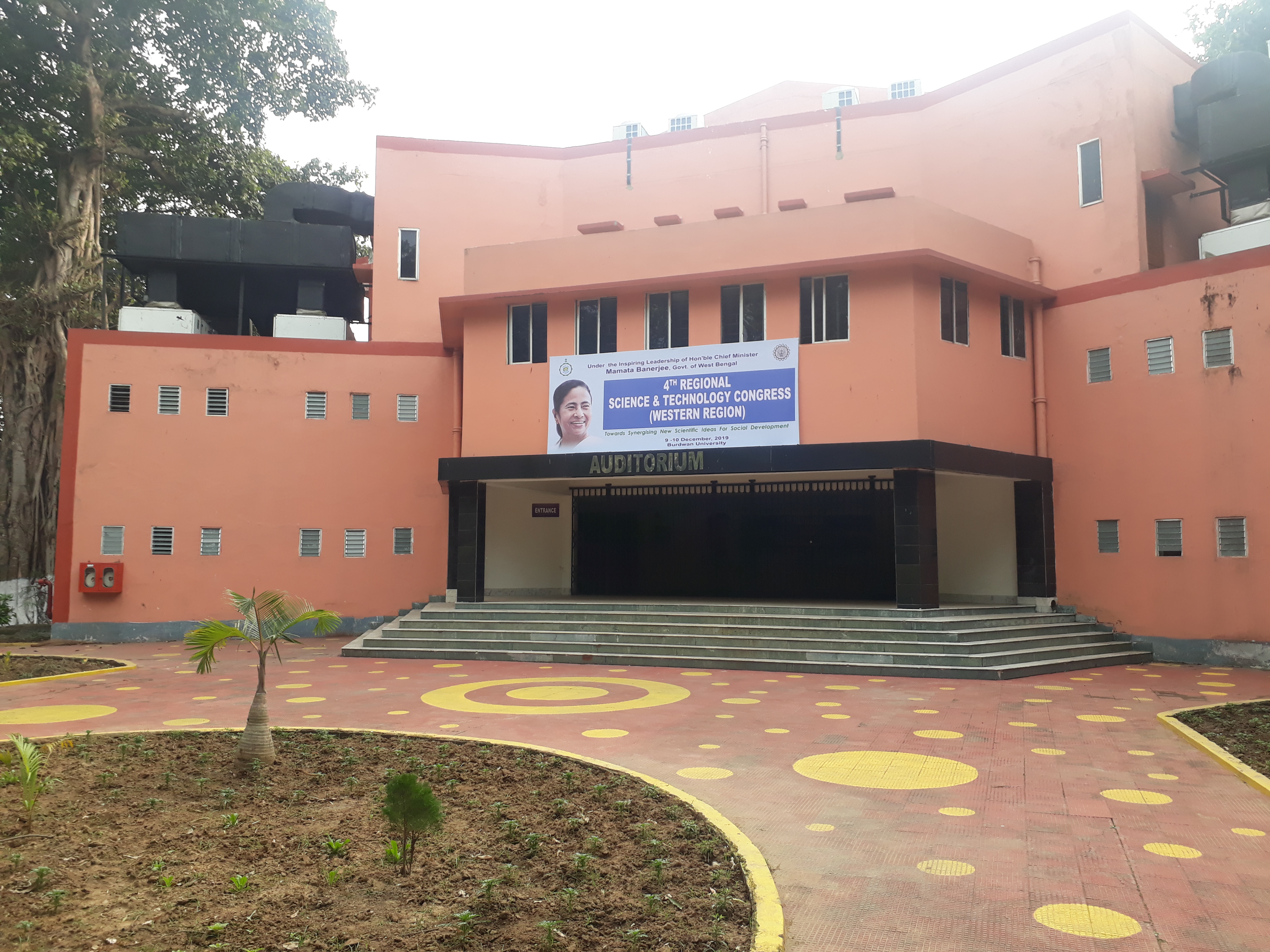
Burdwan University Auditorium

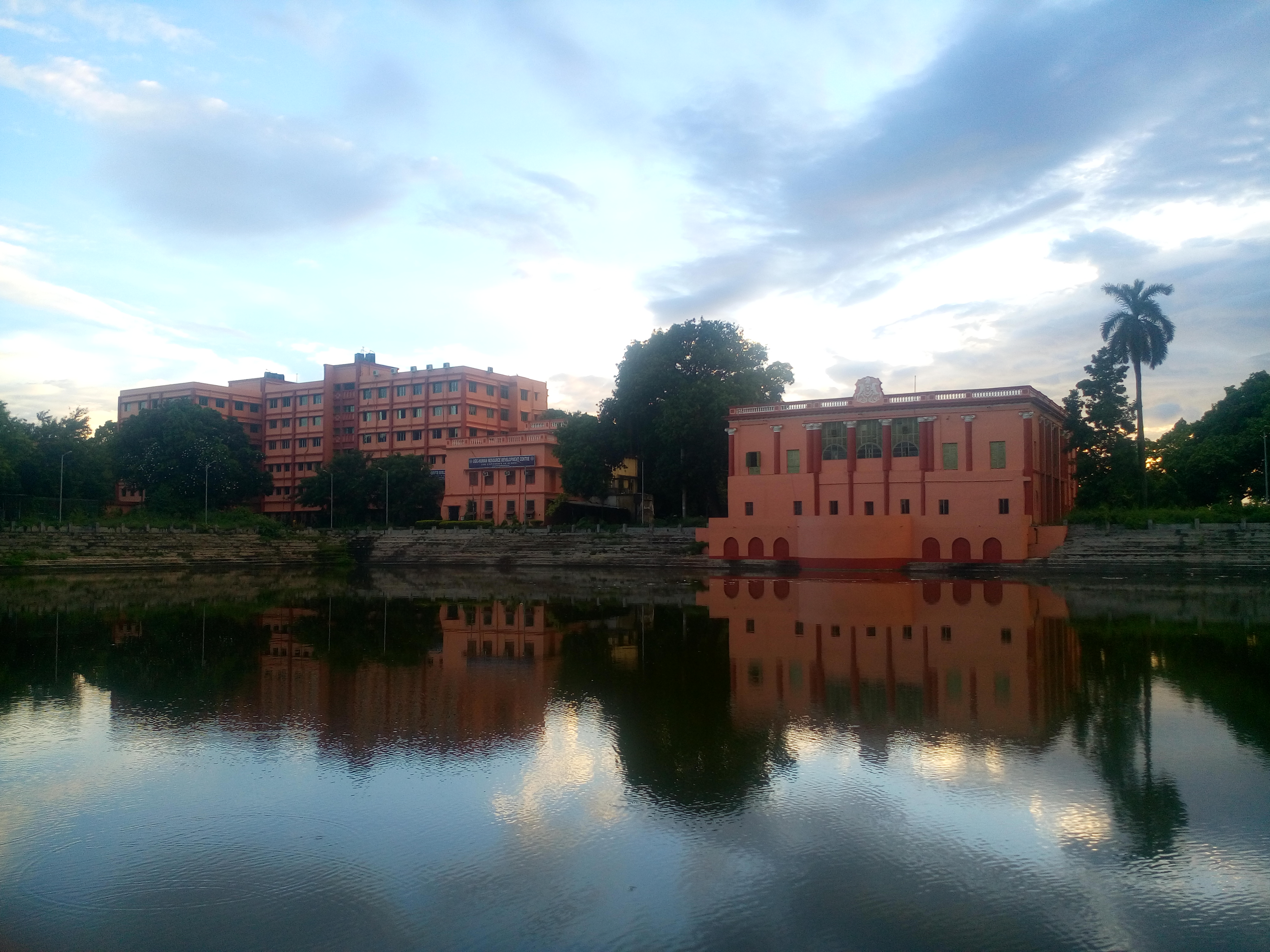
Historical Lake and the Burdwan Raj Palace

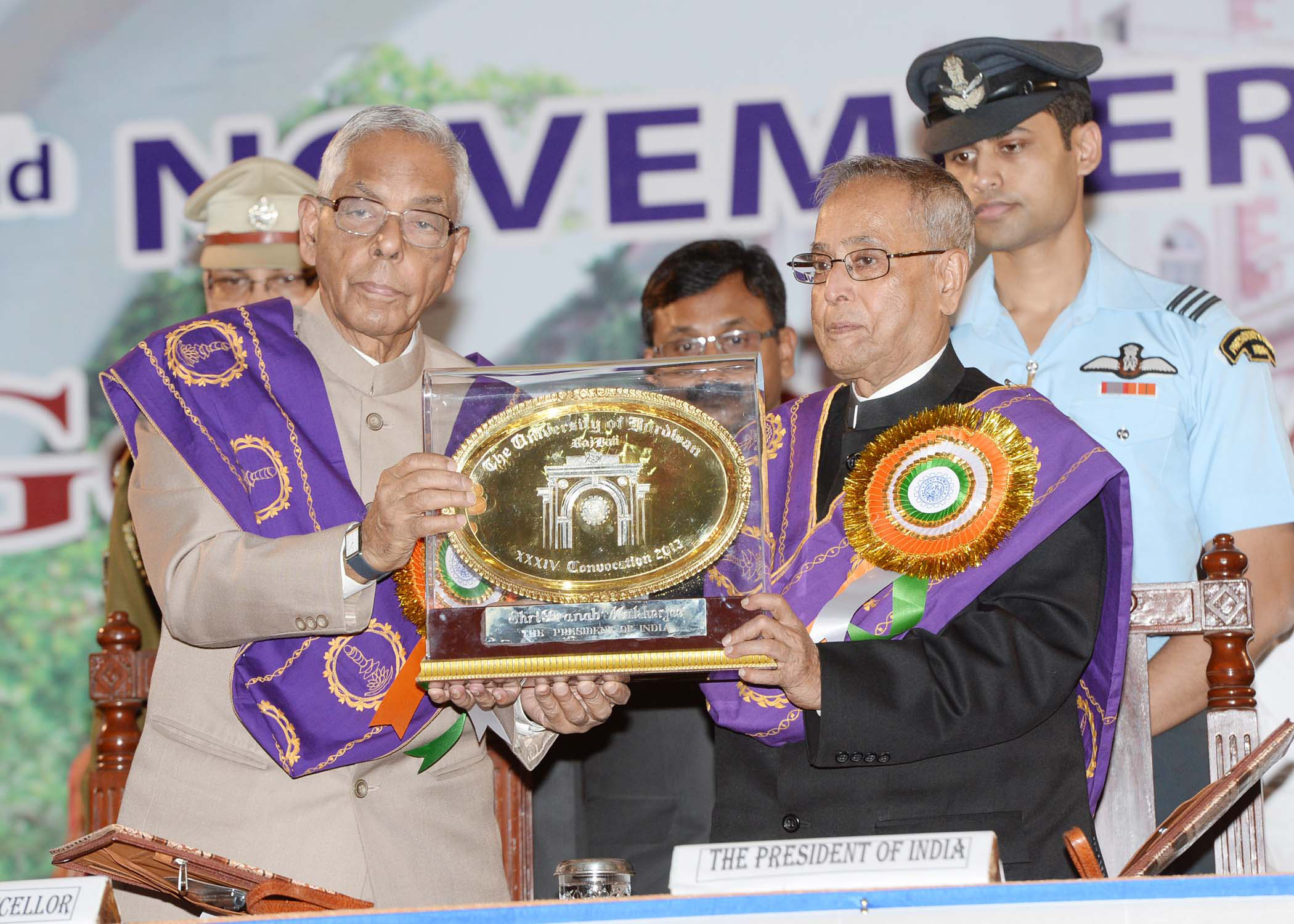
The President, Shri Pranab Mukherjee being presented a memento by the Governor of West Bengal, Shri M.K. Narayanan, at the 34th Convocation of Burdwan University, at Burdwan, West Bengal on November 22, 2013

=== Faculties and departments ===
The University of Burdwan has 39 departments(considering UIT as FET or a separate department of engineering which is governed independently) organized into two faculty councils.

Departments
Faculty	Departments
Faculty Council of Arts, Law & Commerce	Bengali; English & Cultural Studies; Hindi; Sanskrit; Santali; Foreign Languages (French, German, Russian, Japanese, Spanish); Arabic; Business Administration; Commerce; Economics; Education; History; Law; Library & Information Science; Mass Communication; Philosophy; Physical Education; Political Science; Sociology; Tourism Management; Women's Studies
Faculty of Engineering & Technology	Computer Science & Engineering; Electrical Engineering; Electronics & Communication Engineering; Information Technology; Civil Engineering; Applied Electronics & Instrumentation Engineering
Faculty Council of Science	Biotechnology; Botany; Chemistry; Computer Science; Electronics & Communication; Environmental Science; Geography; Geospatial Science; Mathematics; Microbiology; Molecular Biology & Human Genetics; Nutrition & Public health; Physics; Physiology; Psychology; Statistics; Zoology

=== Centre ===
List of Centre of University of Burdwan
- University Science & Instrumentation Centre
- Centre for Distance and Online Learning
- Malaviya Mission Teacher Training Centre
- Swami Vivekananda Advance Research Centre
- Binoy Krishna Choudhury Rural Technology Centre
- Lifelong Learning Centre
- Sports Board
- National Service Scheme (NSS)

=== University Institute of Technology (UIT) ===
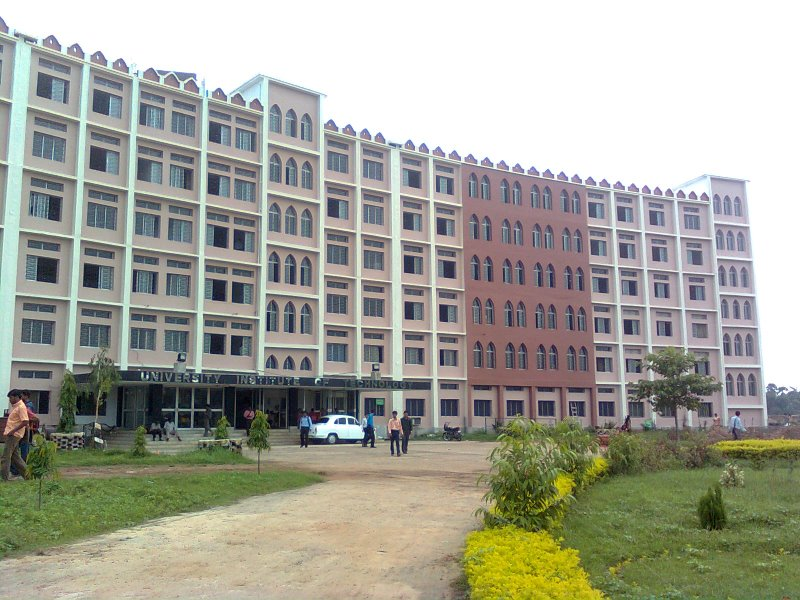
University Institute of Technology, Burdwan University

University Institute of Technology, The University of Burdwan (abbr. UITBU) represents the Faculty of Engineering & Technology (FET), constituent to The University of Burdwan, located in Burdwan, West Bengal. It is the only Government Engineering Public Technical Institute located in Purba Bardhaman. Earlier it represented the faculty of Engineering that was at National Institute of Technology, Durgapur since its inception. This college building was inaugurated in 2001 by the then chief minister of West Bengal Shri Buddhadeb Bhattacharya.

=== Jurisdictions ===
Burdwan University now serves as an academic hub for over 74 affiliated colleges, with its jurisdiction extending across Birbhum district, Purba Bardhaman district and Hooghly district (except the Srirampore subdivision) The university's affiliation ensures that these institutions adhere to a high standard of education, offering undergraduate and postgraduate courses in various disciplines. Through its affiliation, Burdwan University provides academic guidance, curriculum development, and examination services, ensuring that the quality of education remains consistent and rigorous across all its colleges. This extensive network not only supports the educational needs of the region but also contributes significantly to the cultural and intellectual fabric of Radh Bengal. Some of the colleges are listed below:

- Aghorekamini Prakashchandra Mahavidyalaya
- Arambagh Girls' College
- Burdwan Raj College
- Bejoy Narayan Mahavidyalaya
- Birbhum Mahavidyalaya
- Bolpur College
- Galsi Mahavidyalaya
- Government General Degree College, Mangalkote
- Gushkara Mahavidyalaya
- Hooghly Mohsin College
- Hooghly Women's College
- Kabi Joydeb Mahavidyalaya
- Kalna College
- Katwa College
- Maharajadhiraj Uday Chand Women's College
- Mankar College
- Memari College
- Netaji Mahavidyalaya
- Purni Devi Chaudhuri Girls' College
- Syamsundar College
- Tarakeswar Degree College
- Vivekananda Mahavidyalaya
- Kandra Radha Kanta Kundu Mahavidyalaya
- Purbasthali College

== Academics ==
=== Admission ===
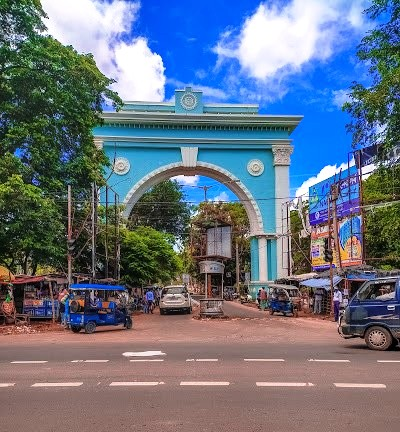
BU Golapbag Campus Main Gate

For admission into the Undergraduate courses of Faculty Council of Arts, Law & Commerce & Faculty Council of Science, one has to apply in the affiliated colleges which will provide B.A., B.Com., L.L.B., B.Sc. degrees for which Higher Secondary Examination marks is considered for selection. For Postgraduate admission, the general eligibility criteria is to secure a minimum marks for admission to the unreserved seats in all M.A./M.Sc./M.Com./L.L.M. course of studies under Faculty Councils of Science & Arts is 50% at the Honours level in the concerned/relevant subject.

For admissions to the Engineering courses at the undergraduate level of Faculty of Engineering & Technology, students are admitted through the WBJEE, an entrance examination open to students from all over India. Unlike in a large number of states, there is no domicile quota in BU (or for other engineering colleges admitting students through the WBJEE). Postgraduate students in engineering are admitted through GATE exam.

To apply for Ph.D. admission at Burdwan University, candidates must have one of the following qualifications: a 1-year/2-semester master's degree after a 4-year/8-semester bachelor's degree; a 2-year/4-semester master's degree after a 3-year bachelor's degree; or a professional degree equivalent to a master's degree. Candidates must have at least 55% marks or an equivalent grade in the relevant subject. For those applying after a 4-year/8-semester bachelor's degree with research, a minimum of 75% marks is required. Degrees from foreign institutions must be accredited by an authorized agency in the home country. Also a candidate must pass a 100-mark written entrance test covering Research Methodology and their specific subject, with a minimum score of 50% required to qualify for the final viva voce. A 5% relaxation is available for reserved categories. Candidates with an M.Phil. degree (with coursework) or those who have cleared national-level tests like UGC–NET are exempt from the entrance test. Qualified candidates or those exempt must then attend a 30-mark interview conducted by the university's Doctoral Committee.

=== National rankings ===
University rankings

Global – Overall
- USNWR Global: 1921 (2024-25)

Regional – Overall
- QS Asia: 621-640
- USNWR Asia: 775 (2024-25)

National – Overall
- USNWR National: 79 (2024-25)

University rankings

General – India
- NIRF (Overall) (2024): 151-200
- NIRF (Universities) (2024): 101-150

The Burdwan University has ranked 36th in India and ranked 3rd in West Bengal after Jadavpur University & Calcutta University among the state public university category by National Institutional Ranking Framework (NIRF) in 2024.

=== Distance education ===
The University of Burdwan has a Directorate of Distance Education (DDE, BU) for conducting post-graduate studies in distance mode. This is for people (mainly workers) who cannot undergo post-graduate studies in regular (full-time) mode. The DDE was established in 1994. Courses of distance education in the university are approved by University Grants Commission (UGC) and the Distance Education Council.It was the first of its kind in West Bengal. It evolved and developed since its inception and now in 2008 it has a good infrastructure of its own. Situated in the Golapbag Campus, the DDE has a beautiful building of its own. It houses all the administrative departments of the directorate and holds counselling sessions for different courses it runs.

=== Central Library ===
The Central Library is housed in a two-storey building on the Golapbag campus, centrally located for easy access from all university departments. The library spans approximately 12,000 square feet and operates from 8 am to 7 pm on weekdays, with reduced hours on Saturdays from 10 am to 5 pm. The library is closed on Sundays. In addition, there are 19 departmental libraries on the Golapbag campus, each affiliated with its respective department.

The library offers consultation services to external scholars, teachers from affiliated colleges, students from other universities, and alumni of Burdwan University, in accordance with the Library Rules. Membership is available to the university's teachers, scholars, students, officers, non-teaching staff, retired personnel, academic staff from affiliated colleges, alumni, and other academicians. Ex-students from other universities, as well as other academicians and teachers from affiliated colleges, can obtain individual membership by presenting proper identification and paying a fee (Rs.100 for ex-students, Rs.2000 for other categories). Members are entitled to library services as per the Library Rules.

The library boasts a collection of 160,000 volumes of books, 30,000 journals, 2,500 theses, and various other materials. It also has a rich selection of encyclopedias, dictionaries, handbooks, yearbooks, atlases, and directories, which readers can consult to answer their queries. A display board regularly showcases new arrivals. Additionally, the library has an Archival Cell, which currently holds 2,500 items were received from the Burdwan Raj Family Library.

=== Meghnad Saha Planetarium ===
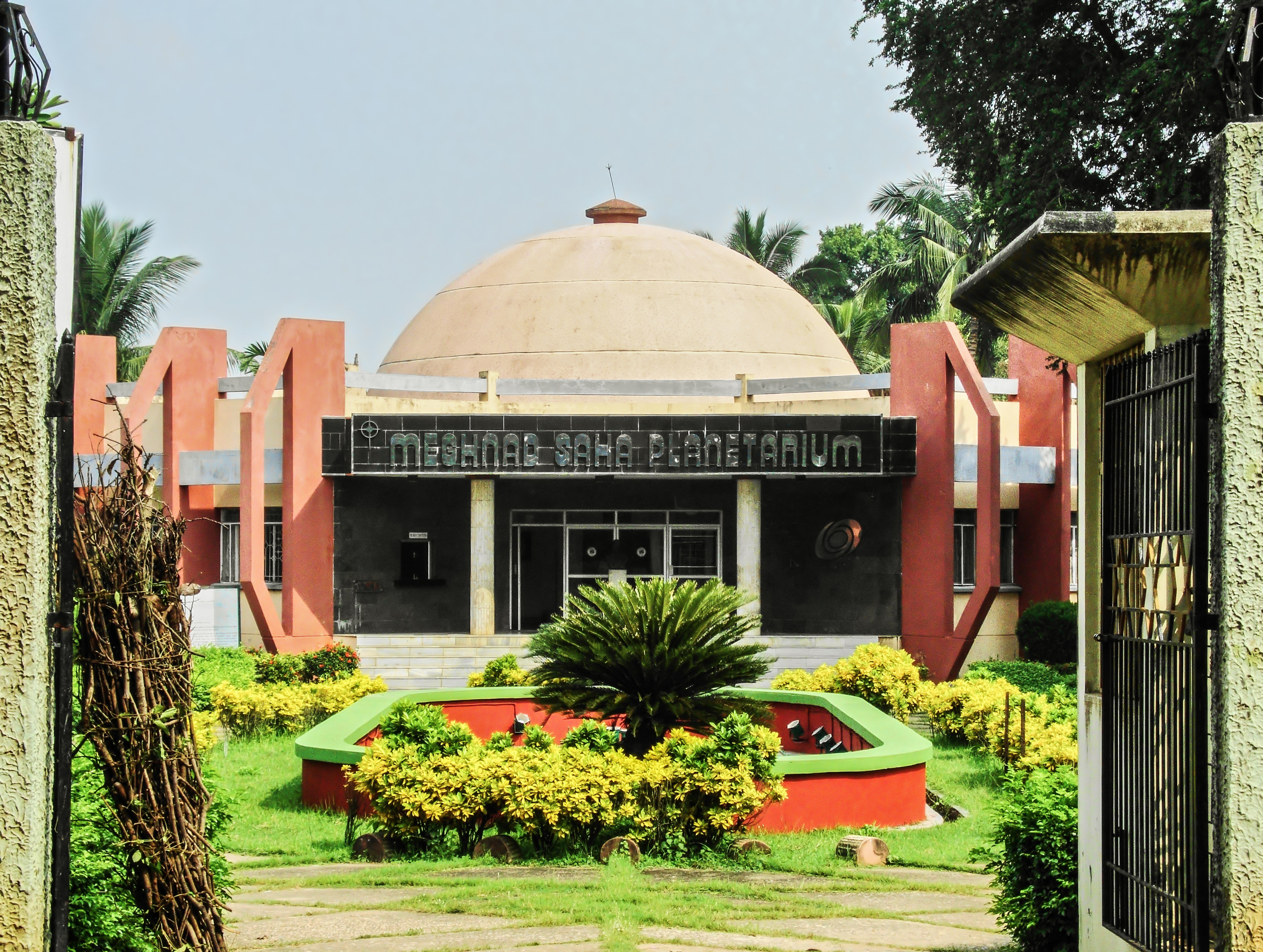
Meghnad Saha Planetarium

The Meghnad Saha Planetarium, established in 1994, is not only a source of pride for Burdwan but is also perhaps the only planetarium in India operating under the auspices of a university. Equipped with a high-quality projection system and modern technologies, the Planetarium organises shows on the mysteries of the universe, the birth of stars, the motion of planets, aspects of lunar exploration, and other astrophysical phenomena. These shows also introduce viewers to the activities of NASA and the European Space Agency related to space research. The presentations include information about the birth of the Milky Way, the Milky Way's neighbouring galaxy Andromeda Galaxy, the discovery of the mysterious black holes, the evolution of the Solar System, comets, and asteroid belts.

The Planetarium plays a crucial role in raising awareness about the dangers of environmental pollution and global warming. The irreversible effects of industrial pollution, the depletion of the ozone layer, and the greenhouse effect are contemporary issues that are also addressed in the shows organised by the Planetarium.

=== University museum and art gallery ===
Burdwan University Museum and Art Gallery have collections of different antiquities and art objects dating from 1500 BC to the 19th century AD. Museum also has collections of stone sculptures bronze figures, ancient coins, brass and alloy, painting of the Indo-European school, terracotta plaques, etc. One can visit the university museum any day (except holidays) during office hours (11 AM to 4 PM).

== Notable alumni and faculties ==
- Akhil Ranjan Chakravarty, an Indian organic chemist
- Amalendu Chandra, an Indian theoretical physical chemist
- Anuparna Roy, filmmaker, winner of Best Director in the Orizzonti section at the 82nd Venice International Film Festival (2025).
- Balaram Mukhopadhyay, an Indian Bengali carbohydrate chemist
- Kamanio Chattopadhyay, an Indian materials engineer
- Minakshi Mukherjee, Indian politician
- Manoj Majee, an Indian plant molecular biologist, biochemist, inventor and a senior scientist
- Riksundar Banerjee, a fiction writer
- Partha Sarathi Mukherjee, an Indian inorganic chemist
- Priyabatra Mukherjee, an American, academic researcher and professor
- Saleh Ali Al-Kharabsheh, the Jordanian Minister of Energy and Mineral Resources
- Somai Kisku, Indian writer in Santali language
- Sudip Chattopadhyay, an Indian developmental biologist, biotechnologist
- Suman Kumar Dhar, an Indian molecular biologist
- Tapas Paul, an Indian actor
- Jahanara Khan, politician

== See also ==
- University Institute of Technology (UIT)
- List of universities in India
- List of educational institutions in West Bengal
