= Durgapur =

Planned Urban Agglomeration and Major Industrial Hub of West Bengal, India

- Urban Agglomeration
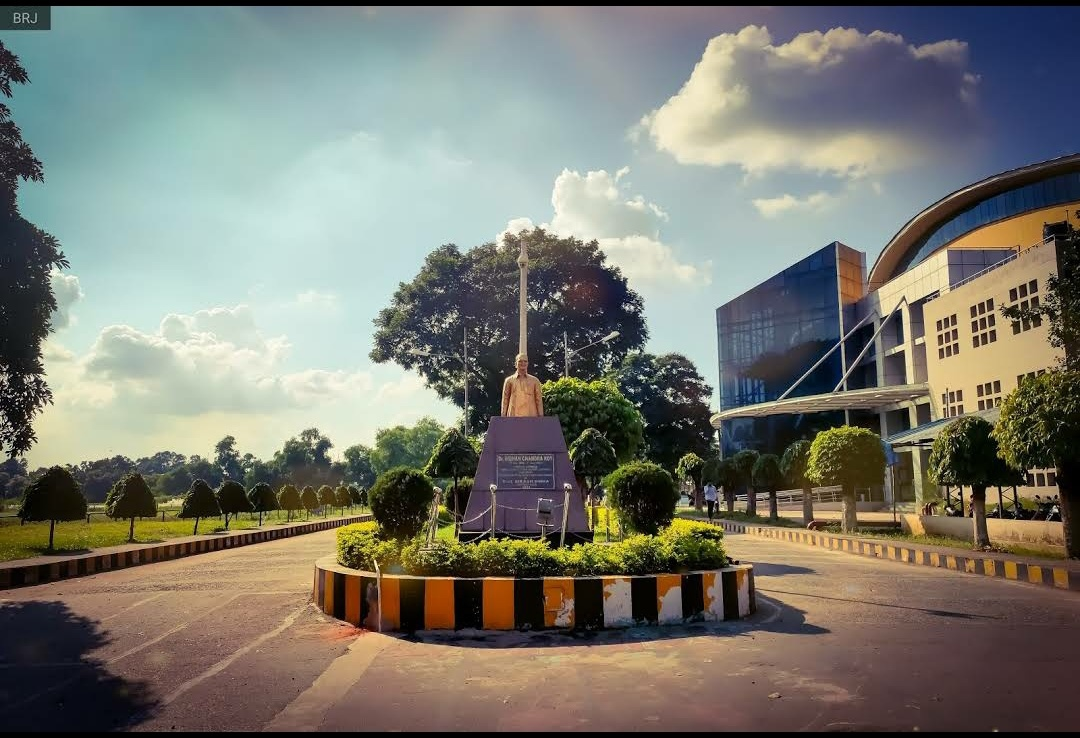
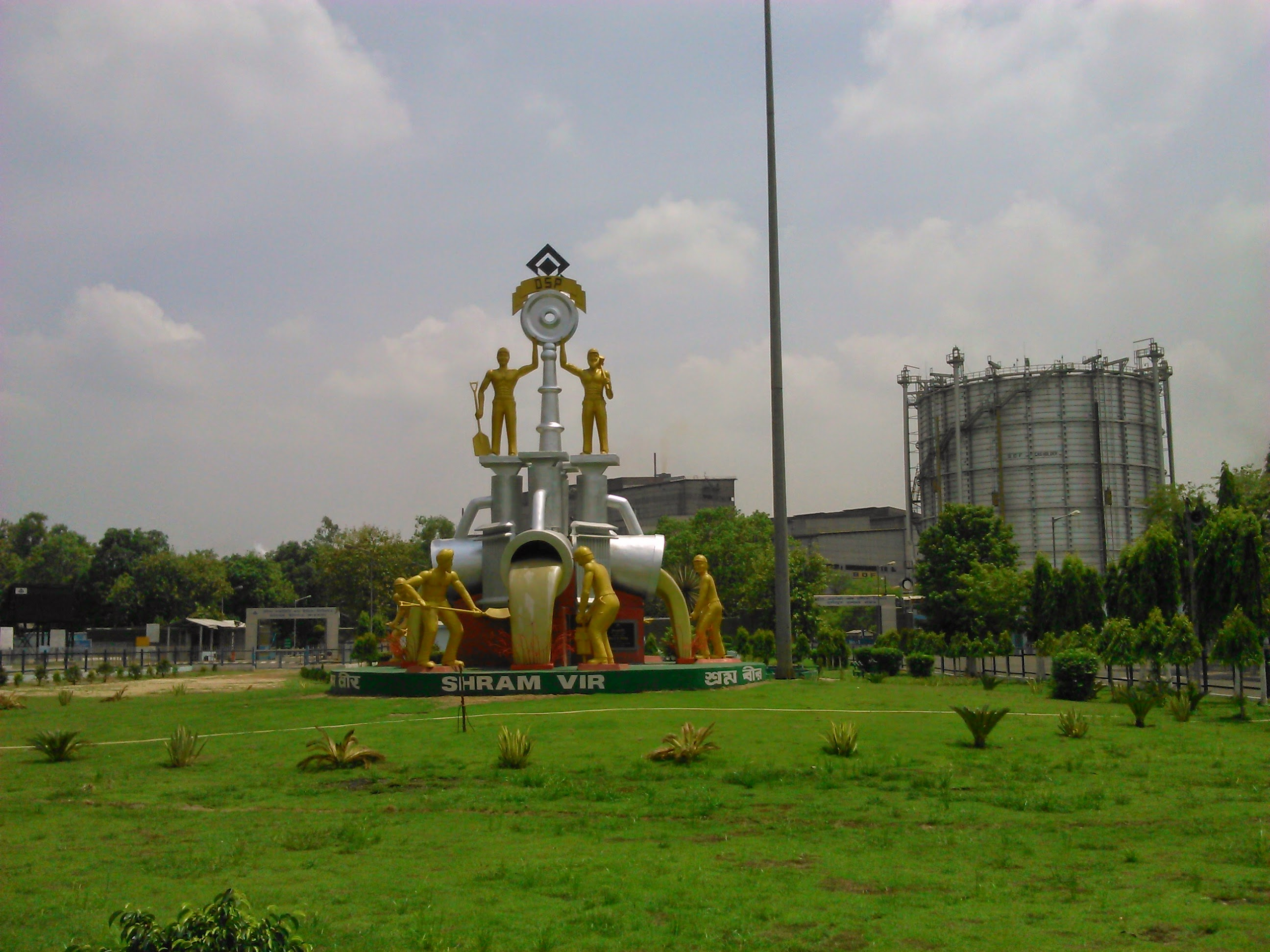
- Statue of Bidhan Chandra Roy in NIT Durgapur Kazi Nazrul Islam Airport Durgapur Steel Plant
- Nickname: Ruhr of India
- Location within West Bengal Location within India Location within Asia
- Coordinates: 23°33′N 87°19′E
- Country: India
- State: West Bengal
- District: Paschim Bardhaman
- Established: Late 1950s
- Founder: Bidhan Chandra Roy (former Chief Minister of West Bengal)
- Named for: Durgacharan Chattopadhyay

Government
  - Type: Municipal Corporation
  - Body: Durgapur Municipal Corporation
  - Legislature: Members: MP Kirti Azad (Bardhaman–Durgapur; TMC); MLA Pradip Mazumdar (Durgapur Purba; TMC); MLA Lakshman Chandra Ghorui (Durgapur Paschim; BJP)
  - Executive: Officers: IAS Sh. Ponnambalam S., DM, Paschim Bardhaman; IAS Smt. Aditi Chaudhary, Commissioner of Asansol Municipal Corporation & CEO, ADDA; IPS Sunil Kumar Choudhary, CP, Asansol–Durgapur Police Commissionerate (in the rank of IG); IAS Ms. Nitu, ADM, Pascham Bardhaman; IAS Ms. Subashini E., ADM, Paschim Bardhaman; WBCS Sanjoy Paul, ADM; WBCS Aranya Banerjee, ADM; WBPS Mir Sahidul Ali, ADC; WBPS Subrata Deb, ADC; WBPS Pradip Mondal, ADC
  - Judiciary: Judges: AIJS Shri Debaprasad Nath, District & Sessions Judge; WBJS Mohd. Aqil Saifi, ADSJ; AIJS Lokesh Pathak, ADSJ; WBJS Shri Prashant Chowdhary, ADSJ; WBJS Md. Rafique Alam, ADSJ

Area
  - Urban: 154.20 km^{2} (59.54 sq mi)
  - Metro: 771.28 km^{2} (297.79 sq mi)
  - Rank: 4th in West Bengal
- Elevation: 65 m (213 ft)

Population (2024)
  - Rank: 4th in West Bengal
  - Urban: 726,000
  - Metro: 1,209,372
- Demonym(s): Durgapurbashi, Durgapurians

Languages
  - Official: Bengali
  - Additional official: English
- Time zone: UTC+5:30 (IST)
- PIN: 713201–713217
- Telephone code: +91 0343
- Vehicle registration: WB-39 / WB-40
- Lok Sabha constituency: Bardhaman–Durgapur
- Vidhan Sabha constituency: Durgapur Purba; Durgapur Paschim
- Climate: Aw
- Transit: Highway: NH-19; Grand Trunk Road; AH1; Railway: DGR; Airport: Kazi Nazrul Islam Airport
- City Development Authority: Asansol Durgapur Development Authority (ADDA)
- Website: durgapurmunicipalcorporation.org

Durgapur (Bengali pronunciation: [durgapur]), is a major industrial hub and a planned urban agglomeration in the Indian state of West Bengal. It stands on the northern bank of the Damodar river and is located in Paschim Bardhaman district. Durgapur is a major centre for producing steel and manufacturing train wheels in India. Over the past few years, this city has also been developed as a hub for the IT industry in India. The city was planned by Bidhan Chandra Roy, Joseph Allen Stein and Benjamin Polk in 1955. Durgapur is the only city in eastern India to have an operational dry dock. Durgapur has been nicknamed the 'Steel Backbone of Industrial Bengal'.

== History ==
Durgapur, known as the "Ruhr of India," is a stretch of land along the Damodar and Ajay rivers which has carried thousands of years of human history, geological evolution, and local legend layered on top of one another. Exacavations show evidence of prehistoric artifacts in the area. Numerous stone tools from around 5000 BC have been discovered during archeological digs in Birbhanpur, on the bank of the Damodar. Many of these are tools that prehistoric hunters utilized. Previously, evidence of a civilization that may have been connected to the Indus Valley Civilization was found in part of the excavations at Pandu Rajar Dhibi, on the banks of the Ajay, just outside of Durgapur but in the Bardhaman district. The area had long been heavily forested by the medieval period, and dacoits like the famous Bhabani Pathak were said to have lived there. The area is traversed by the historic Grand Trunk Road, which was constructed under Sher Shah Suri. A small hill with ancient stone structures close to the current City Centre complex is believed to have functioned as a watchtower during that time, though local folklore attributes it to Icchai Ghosh, a powerful local landlord who is said to have used it as an observation post. According to historians, the area was first ruled by the Mauryan and Gupta empires, then by the Mughals, and finally by the Bardhaman Raj, based on a lease from the Mughal ruler. The settlement that developed there became known as Gopinathpur Mouja after a landlord named of Gopinath Chattopadhyay leased a section of the dense Jangalmahal forest—within the present-day Durgapur—from the Maharaja of Bardhaman around 1765. According to one account, the later name 'Durgapur' may actually have originated from one of Gopinath's sons, Durgadas. Gopinath's descendant, Durgacharan Chattopadhyay, continued Gopinath's efforts to make the forest tract livable by founding a new colony in what is now the Sagarbhanga neighborhood of Durgapur. There, Durgacharan constructed a Kali temple in 1793 and a Shiva temple in 1803; the family's zamindar mansion remains in Sagarbhanga today. The area continued to be ruled as tributary of the Mughal emperor throughout the Bardhaman Raj during the 17th and mid-18th centuries. After the Battle of Plassey, this changed when Mir Kassem, the Nawab of Bengal at the time, gave Bardhaman, Medinipur, and Chittagong to the East India Company in 1760. The Bardhaman Raj persisted, but it was now governed by the British rather than the Mughals. When the East India Company built a railroad between Bardhaman and Andal in 1855, the locals decided to honor Durgacharan Chattopadhyay by naming the new station "Durgapur." Because of the settlement's location on the nation's growing railway network, this was the first time the name was recorded in writing.

== Geography ==
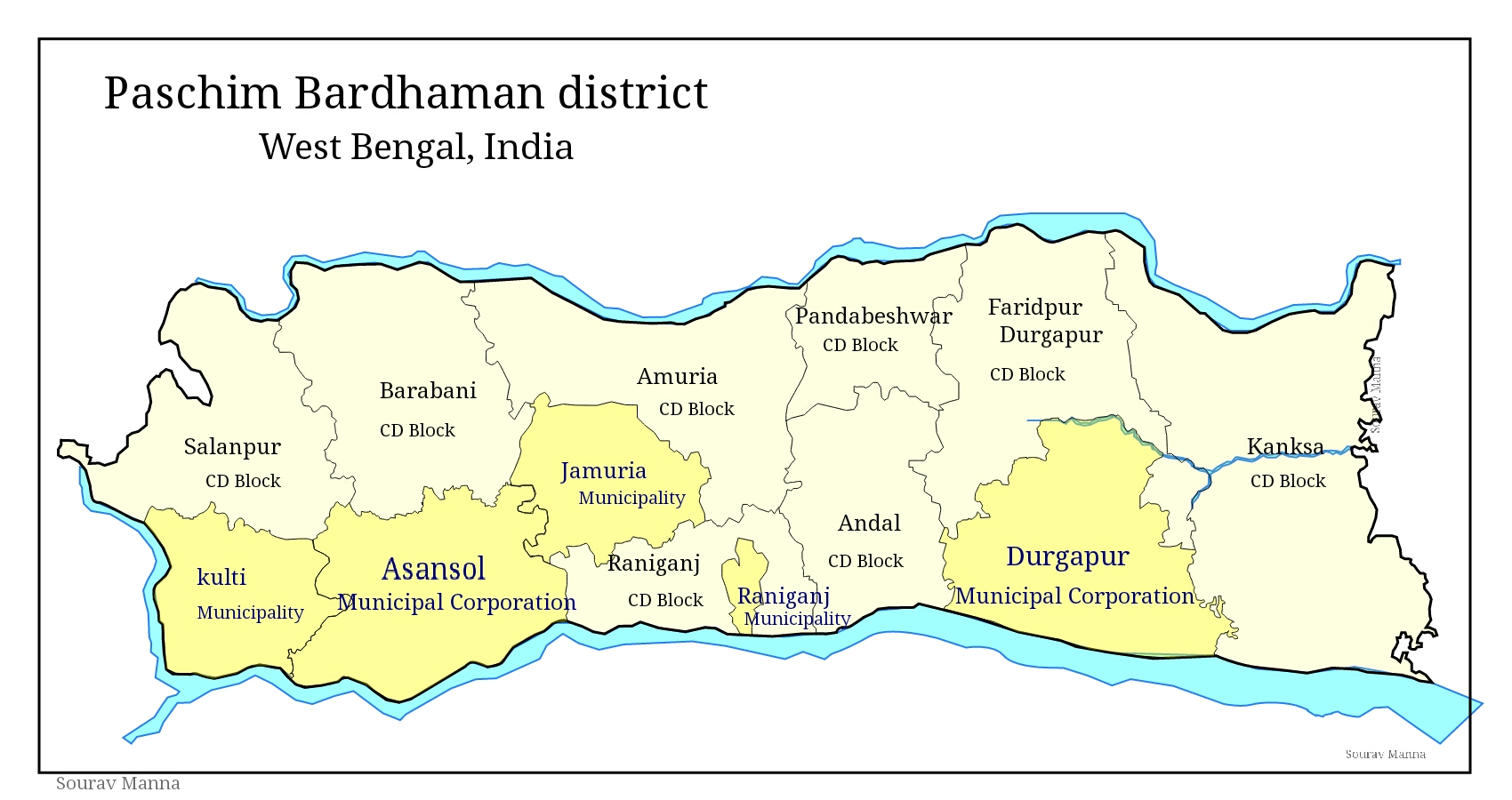
Map of Paschim Bardhaman district

=== Location ===
Durgapur is located at 23.55°N 87.32°E. It has an average elevation of 65 metres (213 ft).

Durgapur is in the Paschim Bardhaman district of West Bengal, on the bank of the Damodar River, just before it enters the alluvial plains of Bengal. The topography is undulating. The coal-bearing area of the Raniganj coalfields lies just beyond Durgapur; some parts intrude into the area. The area was deeply forested until the end of 20th century and some streaks of the indigenous sal and Mahua forests can still be seen scantily.

Durgapur
R: temple, mosque, P: park, F: facility, N: neighbourhood, W: works, factory
Owing to space constraints in the small map, the actual locations in a larger map may vary slightly
Places marked on this map, which have a separate page, are linked in the larger full screen map

=== Environment ===
Durgapur has been ranked 35th best “National Clean Air City” under (Category 2 3-10L Population cities) in India.

=== Climate ===
Durgapur

Climate chart (precipitation, max. and min. temperature)
J	F	M	A	M	J	J	A	S	O	N	D
14 22 9	19 29 15	25 36 19	31 45 24	87 41 26	275 42 26	334 37 26	338 35 25	239 34 25	78 32 22	15 28 17	24 25 10
- █ Average max. and min. temperatures in °C
- █ Precipitation totals in mm
Imperial conversion
J	F	M	A	M	J	J	A	S	O	N	D
0.6 72 48	0.7 84 59	1 97 66	1.2 113 75	3.4 106 79	11 108 79	13 99 79	13 95 77	9.4 93 77	3.1 90 72	0.6 82 63	0.9 77 50
- █ Average max. and min. temperatures in °F
- █ Precipitation totals in inches

Durgapur experiences a somewhat transitional climate between the tropical wet and dry climate of Kolkata and the more humid subtropical climate further north. Summers are extremely hot and dry, lasting from March to the middle of June, with average daily temperatures exceeding 45 °C. They are followed by the monsoon season with heavy precipitation and somewhat lower temperatures. Durgapur receives most of its annual rainfall of around 1,320 mm during this season. The monsoon is followed by a cold, dry winter from November to January. Temperatures are cold, with average daily temperatures dropping near 9 °C. There is a short autumn at the end of October and a short spring in February, both of which have relatively moderate temperatures of around 20 °C. Due to the heavy rainfall it has received in recent years, for almost five months of heavy rainfall every year, locals often refer to the city as "Chhota Cherapunji" (named after the main city of Cherapunji).

== Administration ==
=== Civic Administration ===
The Durgapur Municipal Corporation was constituted according to the provisions of the Durgapur Municipal Corporation Act, 1994 by upgrading the Durgapur Notified Area (DNA). It is divided into 43 wards which are organised into 5 administrative boroughs. Sri Abul Kalam Azad Islam, WBCS (EXE), is the Commissioner of the Municipal Corporation. The Durgapur Municipal Corporation has the following departments: Mayor Office, PWD Department, Purchase Department, Store Department, Water Department, Health Department, Health Services Department, Education & SC and ST Department, General Section, Sports & Environment Department, License Department, Assessment Department, Holding Tax Department and Social Welfare & Food Department.

=== Law Administration ===
==== Police stations ====
Aurobindo Police Station, located in Durgapur Steel Township, opposite to Office of Commissioner of Police (Asansol-Durgapur) has jurisdiction over parts of Andal CD Block. The area covered is 87 km^{2} and the population covered is 292,841. It has following investigation centres under it.

Investigation Centre	Address
B-Zone Investigation Centre	Marconi Avenue, B-Zone
City Centre Investigation Centre	Bengal Ambuja, City Centre
Faridpur Investigation Centre	Near Gandhi More
Waria Investigation Centre	Near DSP Main Gate, Waria
DTPS Investigation Centre	Old Colony, DVC-DTPS

Coke Oven police station, located near the Durgapur Railway Station, has jurisdiction over parts of the Durgapur municipal corporation. The area covered is 49 km^{2} and the population covered is 136,181.

Durgapur Women PS has jurisdiction over the Durgapur Subdivision

New Township police station, located in MAMC township, has jurisdiction over parts of the Durgapur municipal corporation and the Faridpur Durgapur CD Block. The area covered is 23 km^{2}, and the population covered is 160,411. It has a police Outpost located in Bidhannagar under its jurisdiction.

== Demographics ==
In the 2011 census, Durgapur Urban Agglomeration had a population of 566,937 out of which 294,349 were male and 272,588 were female. The 0–6 year population was 50,512. Effective literacy rate of the population was 87.70. Durgapur Municipal Corporation included 3 census towns: Bamunara, Arra, and partly Andal.

In the 2011 census, Durgapur Municipal Corporation had a population of 581,409 out of which 301,700 were male and 279,709 were female. The 0–6 year population was 51,930. Effective literacy rate of the population was 87.84.

=== Religion ===
Religions of Durgapur (2011)
1. Hinduism (91.6%)
2. Islam (6.34%)
3. Sikhism (0.41%)
4. Others (1.62%)

According to Census of India 2011, Hinduism is the predominant religion in this city, followed by Islam, Christianity, Sikhism, Buddhism, Jainism, and others. Out of the 5,66,517 people living in Durgapur (Municipal Corporation); 5,19,122 are Hindus (91.63%), 35,923 are Muslims (6.34%), 1889 are Christians (0.36%), 2346 are Sikhs (0.44%), 513 are Buddhists, 382 are Jains, 906 are other religions, and 5436 (1.04%) did not state their religion.

=== Languages ===
Languages of Durgapur (2011)
1. Bengali (83.0%)
2. Hindi (11.2%)
3. Santali (1.84%)
4. Urdu (1.03%)
5. Others (2.99%)

At the time of the 2011 census, 82.99% of the population spoke Bengali, 11.15% Hindi, 1.84% Santali, and 1.03% Urdu as their first language.

== Economy ==
Durgapur is the biggest industrial hub of West Bengal and was planned as an integrated industrial city. It is the most developed city in West Bengal in terms of technology, infrastructure, and economy next to Kolkata and contributes a substantial amount to the economy of the state of West Bengal. It lies on the banks of Damodar River and near to the coalfields of Raniganj. Durgapur was a dream of former prime minister of India, Jawaharlal Nehru and chief minister of West Bengal, Bidhan Chandra Roy. The 1948-founded Damodar Valley Corporation (DVC) is essential to the growth of the area. The first project in Durgapur was Damodar Valley Corporation's Durgapur Barrage which attracted many public sector units. Durgapur Steel Plant was the first PSU established in the region in 1955 with the help of U.K which was later undertaken by SAIL. Later, an alloy plant was established by Hindustan Steel Ltd. in 1965 which was also acquired by SAIL. From 1951 to 2019, industrial units in the region grew from 46 to 430, with engineering units rising from 18 to 66 and basic metal units booming from 2 to 122. The area's economic strength is driven by its rich coal deposits, excellent transportation, and skilled labor force, making it a key economic hub in West Bengal and Eastern India.

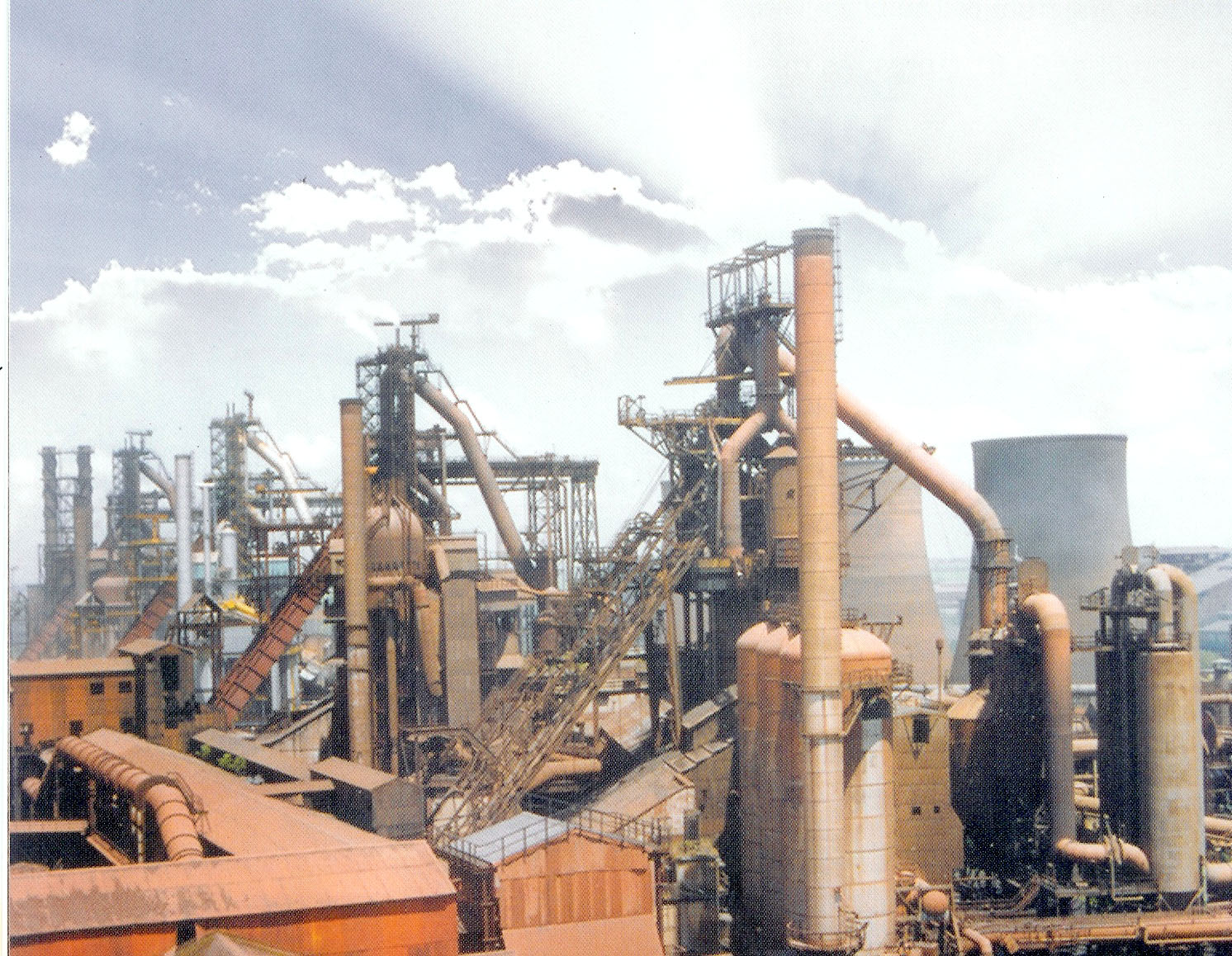
Inside Durgapur Steel Plant

Mining and Allied Machinery Corporation (MAMC) was established in 1964 with the help and support from USSR (now closed but reviving with J.V of Bharat Earth Movers, Coal India & DVC). Hindustan Fertilisers Corporation (HFC) was a major PSU which produced fertilizer but got closed down (now RCF showed interest to reopen it). Bharat Opthlamic Glass Limited (BOGL) was established in 1972 used to manufacture electronic valves and other electronic components. Its closure was approved in 2006.

Durgapur Chemicals Limited (DCL) was set up by the Government of West Bengal in 1963 to boost the chemical needs of the state. DCL started its journey in 1968 and was involved in commercial production of Phenol, phthalic anhydride, monochloro benzene, pentachloro Phenol, caustic soda, chlorine and hydrochloric acid. Although not closed, but the Government of West Bengal decided to disinvest in DCL in 2016 as it had increasingly become a sick industry.

Durgapur Projects Limited (DPL) was the first thermal power station in the city. It was commissioned by the Government of West Bengal in 1960. It has eight production units of which only two are currently operational. The whole city of Durgapur and the surrounding areas get electricity supply from DPL. It is currently owned by West Bengal Power Development Corporation.

Major Indian and international MNCs have their production facilities in Durgapur which includes GE Power India Limited (formerly ACC Babcock Limited which was later taken over by Alstom), Scania and Komatsu (in partnership with Larsen & Toubro), Philips Carbon Black, Sankey Wheels (a unit of GKW), Birla Cement (earlier Durgapur Cement Ltd.), Graphite India Limited, etc.

Durgapur is also an emerging IT and real estate hub. The Government of West Bengal's Webel IT Park houses some of well known as well as startup software companies generating employment opportunities for the youth of the region. It is set to develop many proposed residential areas like DLF's Durgapur Township. Companies like Tata Consultancy Services (a major Indian multinational IT company) etc. have their branch office and back office respectively in the city.

=== Municipal finance ===
According to financial data published on the CityFinance Portal of the Ministry of Housing and Urban Affairs, the Durgapur Municipal Corporation reported total revenue receipts of ₹98 crore (US$12 million) and total expenditure of ₹95 crore (US$11 million) in 2022–23. Tax revenue accounted for about 23.5% of the total revenue, while the corporation received ₹52 crore in grants during the financial year.

== Transport ==
=== Road network ===
Durgapur has a well-defined hierarchical road system comprising approximately 1,780 km of roads, categorized as arterial, sub-arterial, and collector roads.

- Arterial and Sub-Arterial Roads: ~ 480 km
  - Some of the Major corridors include:
    - NH-19
    - Jawaharlal Nehru Avenue
    - Mahatma Gandhi Road
    - Sarat Chandra Avenue
    - Bidhan Chandra Roy Avenue
    - Hahnemann Avenue
    - Bankura Road
    - Bidhan Sarani
    - SSB Sarani
    - Shahid Khudiram bose Sarani
    - Shastri Avenue
    - Zakir Hussain Avenue
- Collector Roads: ~1,300 km

These are generally 7-meter-wide roads serving local traffic within neighborhoods.

Planned areas such as the DSP Township, SEPCO, MAMC, and Bidhan Nagar follow grid or modular patterns with wide roads and proper junctions. In contrast, unplanned areas like Benachity, Bhiringi, Fuljhore, and Palashdiha exhibit organically developed and often narrower road layouts with limited connectivity and lower right-of-way.

The study reports that arterial roads in the planned areas have wider right-of-way (up to 50 m) compared to unplanned areas (as narrow as 15 m). Roads in industrial areas are generally 2-lane undivided roads with inadequate width for the volume of heavy vehicles.

Durgapur is a gateway to the districts of Bankura, Birbhum (Bolpur, Rampurhat, Suri), and Purulia. NH 19 (old numbering: NH 2) passes through the city jurisdiction and SH 9 originates from Muchipara in the city. NH 14 (old numbering NH 60) passes through the north-western suburb of Pandabeswar and finally passes through Raniganj and heads away towards Odisha. It is one of the few cities that has an Asian Highway (AH) passing directly through the city jurisdiction. The AH1 links Japan with Turkey, through Korea, China, Vietnam, Cambodia, Thailand, Myanmar, India, Bangladesh, Pakistan, Afghanistan, and Iran.

Durgapur has three bus termini at Durgapur Railway Station, Prantika (Prantika-I and II), and City Center. Within the city, private mini-buses operate from Durgapur Rly. Station to Prantika, via City Centre, Muchipara and various other routes within the city. Muchipara is an important bus stop in Durgapur, from which all buses are available.

Intra City Routes within the city are as follows:

Route Name	Origin & Destination	Areas Covered
8B	Durgapur Railway Station - Prantika	Sagarbhanga, Muchipara, Bidhannagar, Fuljhore, Sepco (Only bus stop)
8A	Durgapur Railway Station - Prantika	Birbhanpur, Angadpur, DTPS, Faridpur, Benachity.
A - Zone	Durgapur Railway Station - Prantika	Gamon Bus stop, Garrage, DPL bus stop, 1st AB bus stop, City Centre, DSP Township.
B - Zone	Durgapur Railway Station - Prantika	Gamon Bus stop, Garrage, DPL bus stop, 1st AB bus stop, City Centre, Kabiguru, SEPCO Township, IQ - City, DSP Township.
54 - Feet	Durgapur Railway Station - Prantika	Gamon Bus stop, Garrage, DPL bus stop, 1st AB bus stop, City Centre, Gandhi More, 54 Feet Area.
MAMC	Durgapur Railway Station - Prantika	Gamon Bus stop, Garrage, DPL bus stop, MAMC Township, Mamra, Sepco (Only bus stop).
Ichhapur, Ukhra	Prantika - Ichhapur. Prantika - Ukhra.	Dhandabag, Ichhapur, Ukhra.
Bijra	Prantika - Bijra	Bijra.

Auto-rickshaws ply between City Center, Benachity, William Kery, Chandidas, Mamra, Bidhannagar, Railway Station, and other parts of the city in a number of routes. They also act as Feeder Routes to ensure last Mile connectivity. Pre-paid taxis are available in the city from railway stations. Additionally, online cab services like Ola, Uber, etc., and bike taxi services like Rapido are available within the city.

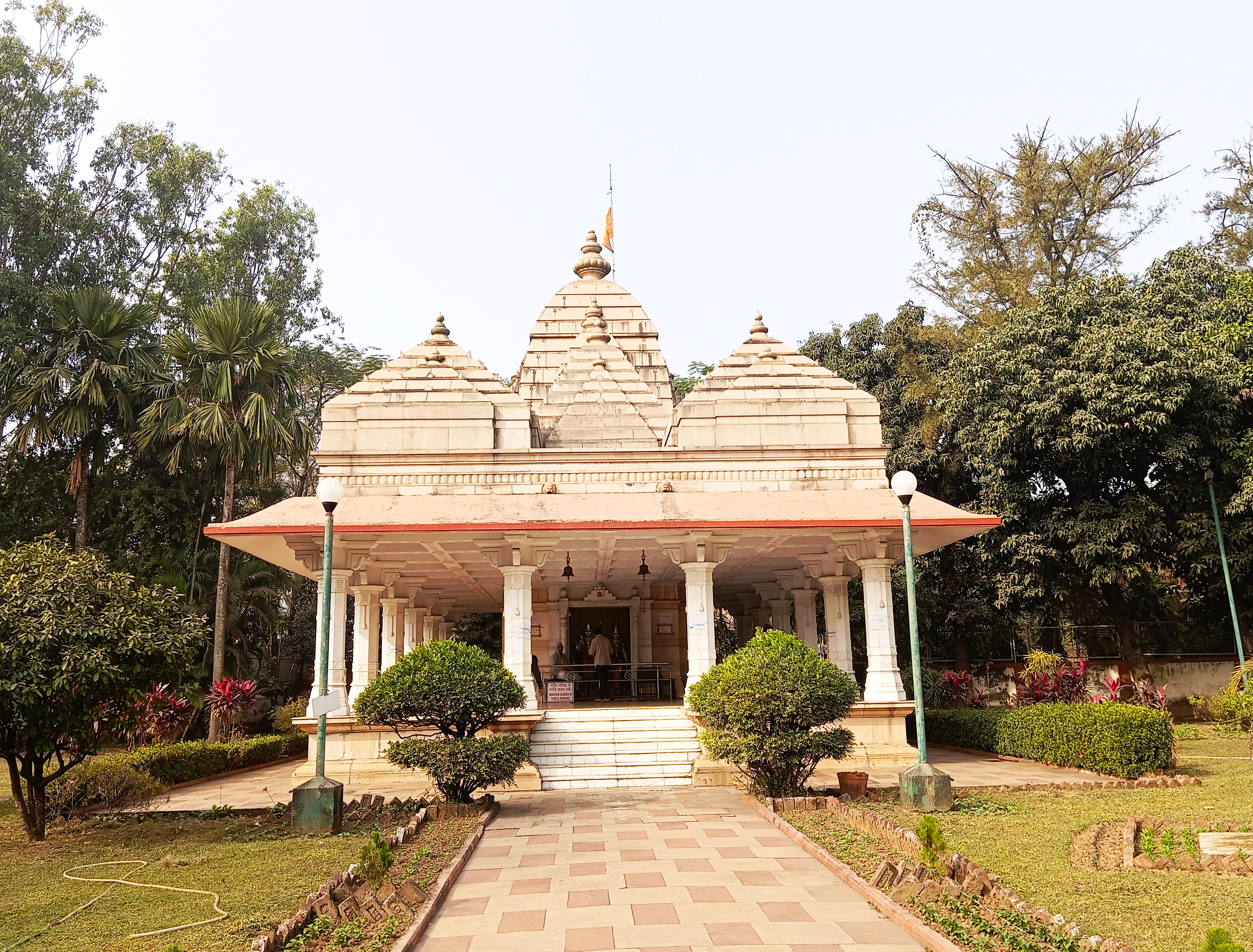
Ram Mandir in Bidhannagar, Durgapur, West Bengal, India

Only one bus is available for the Kalyani-Bansberia route and it departs from Prantika-II Bus Terminus at 4:40 am and from Kalyani at 10 am every day.

Various private and government buses ranging from sleepers to premium Volvos are available from City Center Bus Terminus and Station Bus Terminus for Kolkata, Asansol, Barddhaman, Barakar, Bhubaneswar, Digha, and other nearby cities. Durgapur is the headquarters of SBSTC which provides government bus services to Kolkata, Haldia, Digha, and Bankura, from Durgapur and Asansol. Private buses are available for Asansol, Barakar, Bardhaman, Bolpur, Bishnupur, Chittaranjan, Deoghar, Digha, Illambazar, Jhargram, Kalna, Katwa, Kharagpur, Krishnanagar, Medinipur, Nabadwip, Nalhati, Purulia, Rampurhat, Siuri, Tatanagar, and Tarakeswar, among others.

=== Air ===
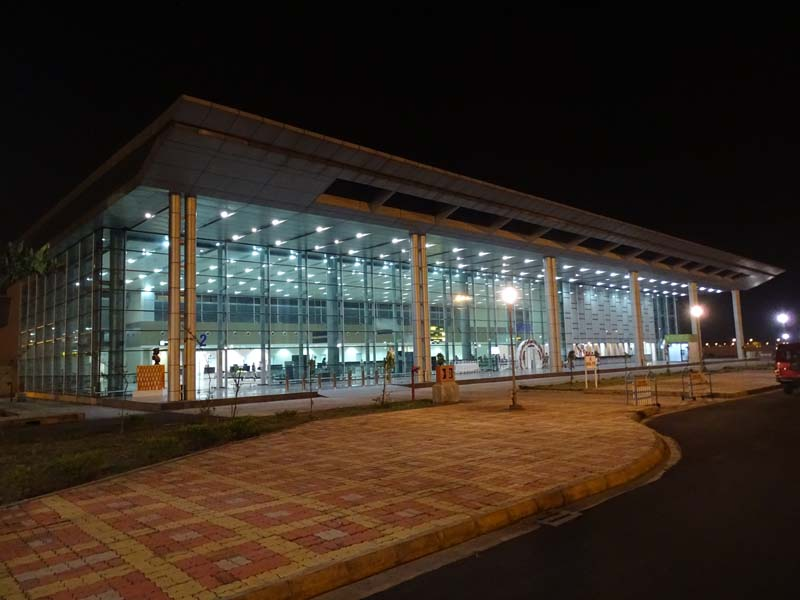
Kazi Nazrul Islam Airport

The city is home to a domestic airport, the Kazi Nazrul Islam Airport. It is India's first private-sector Greenfield airport. It is located at a place called Andal which is roughly 15 kilometres from Durgapur's City Center Bus Terminus. And an old DSP Airport at Bijra near IQ city.

An air force station at Panagarh (Military Airfield), belonging to the Indian Air Force, is used as a base for a C-130J Hercules squadron.

== Administrative changes ==
The administrative setup came in stages. In 1837, when Bankura district was formed, the Durgapur area was part of it. In 1847, the Raniganj subdivision was formed with three police stations – Raniganj, Kanksa, and Neamatpur – and it was made a part of the Bardhaman district. In 1906, the subdivisional headquarters was shifted to Burdwan, and the subdivision renamed accordingly. In 1910, the police stations in Asansol subdivision were Asansol, Ranigunj, Kanksa, Faridpur, and Barakar. On 14 April 1968, the Durgapur subdivision was carved out of Asansol subdivision. In 2011, the Asansol Durgapur Police Commissionerate (ADPC) was formed by the state government.

== Education ==
=== Colleges ===
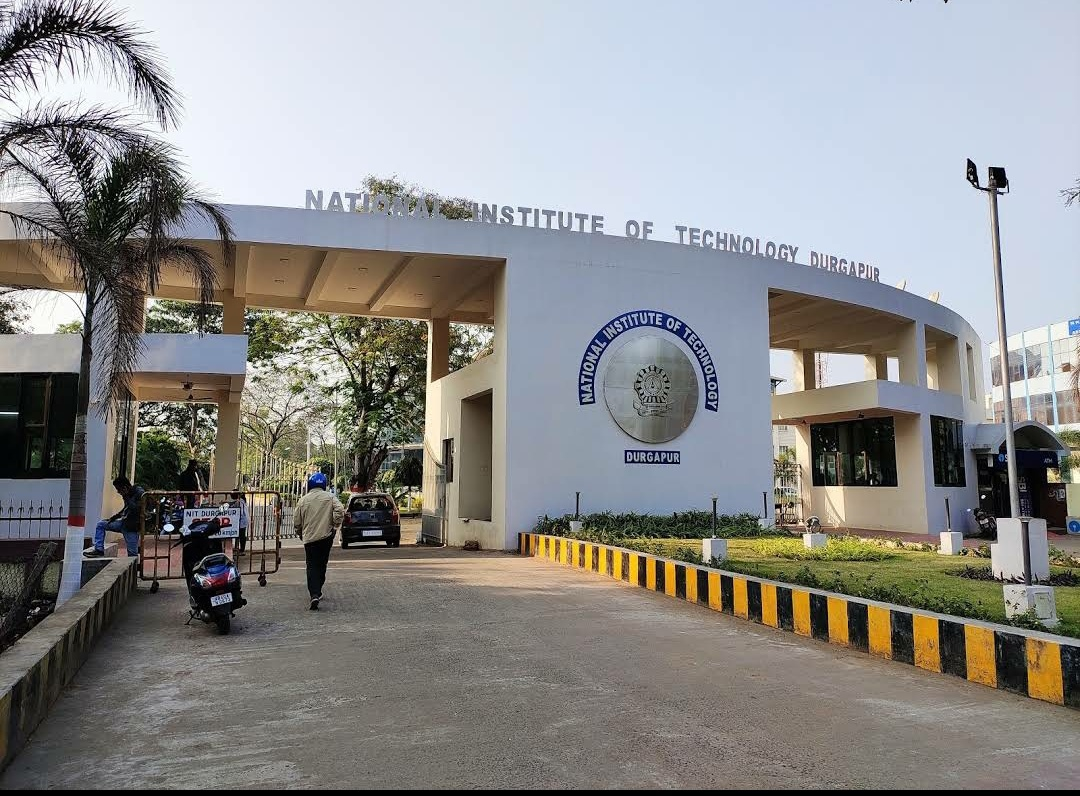
National Institute of Technology, Durgapur, West Bengal, India

Durgapur is home to National Institute of Technology, Durgapur, an autonomous institution in eastern India of national importance. It is one of the 31 N.I.T.s in the country. N.I.T. Durgapur is one of the eight old Regional Engineering Colleges established in 1956.

Durgapur Government College is a premier government degree college not only in the home district of Paschim Barddhaman but also in the neighbouring districts of Bankura, Purulia, and Birbhum. It was established on 15 September 1970, and was affiliated to the University of Burdwan, which later got affiliated to Kazi Nazrul University.

The Central Mechanical Engineering Research Institute (also known as CSIR-CMERI Durgapur or CMERI Durgapur) is a public engineering research and development institution in Durgapur, West Bengal, India. It is a constituent laboratory of the Indian Council of Scientific and Industrial Research (CSIR). The institute is dedicated to work in the mechanical and allied engineering disciplines.

The National Power Training Institute (Also known as NPTI(ER) and formerly known as PETS, Durgapur) is an institute under Ministry of Power, Government of India which offers postgraduate education in the field of power plants. This institute is also associated with several industrial bodies for imparting training to plant personnel.

Dr. B.C. Roy Engineering College, Bengal College of Engineering and Technology, Sanaka Education Trusts Group of Institutions, NSHM Knowledge Campus, Durgapur Institute of Advanced Technology and Management and The Aryabhatta Institute of Engineering & Management are private engineering colleges which offer (B.Tech) in engineering and other degrees, including BBA, BCA, B.Pharm, and others. They are affiliated to Maulana Abul Kalam Azad University of Technology (MAKAUT). Durgapur Women's College and Michael Madhusudan Memorial College are general degree colleges affiliated to Kazi Nazrul University.

Netaji Subhas Open University is a state open university for imparting distance education. It is modelled on the Open University, UK and the IGNOU, and offers courses in different disciplines of graduate and post-graduate courses.

IQ City Medical College and Gouri Devi Institute of Medical Sciences and Hospital are two colleges which offer (MBBS) medical degree and paramedical courses. They are affiliated to West Bengal University of Health Sciences. Durgapur Paramedical College is another college which offers both a diploma and degree in paramedical courses.

=== Public schools ===
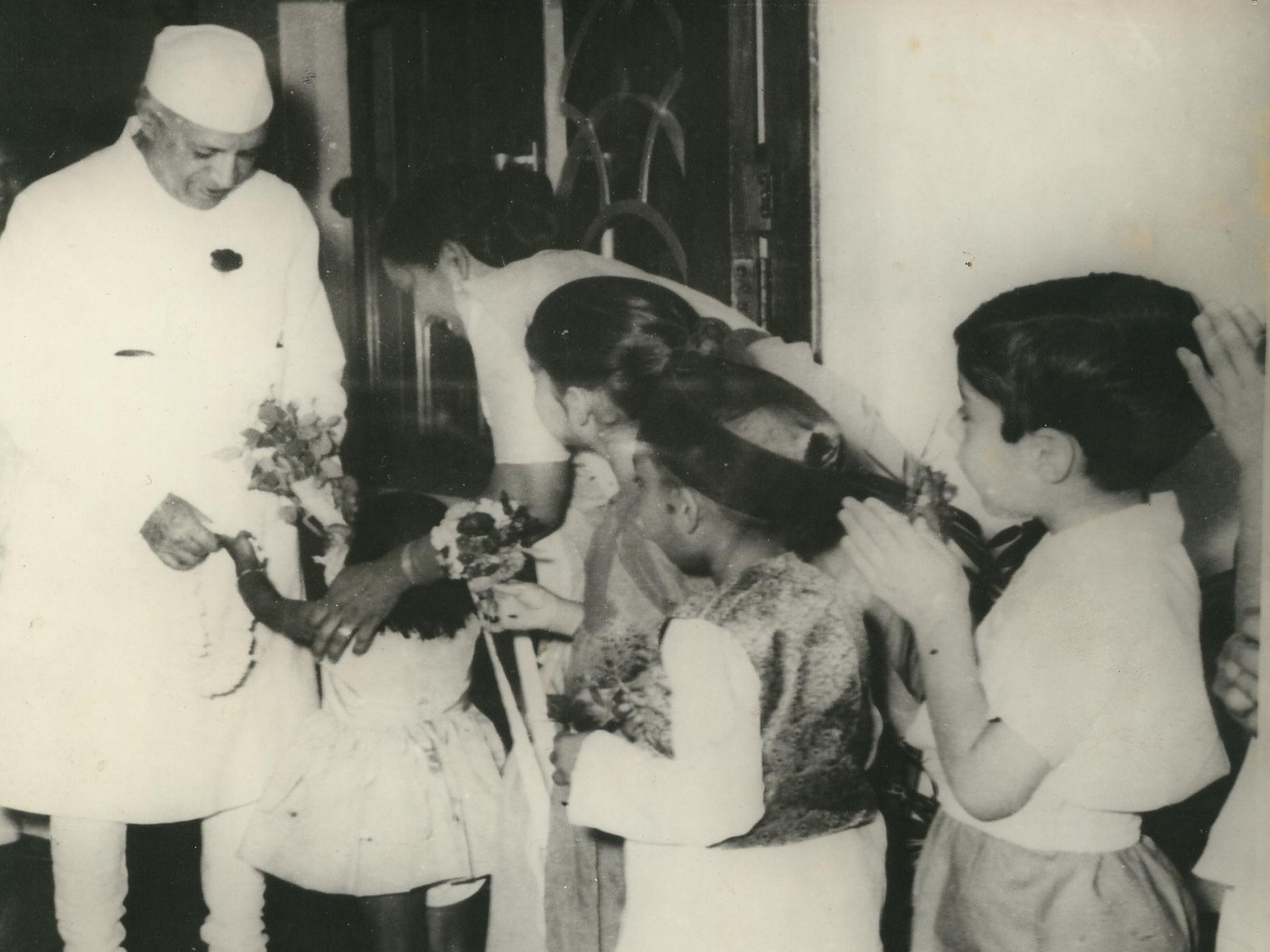
Jawaharlal Nehru with schoolchildren at Durgapur

Durgapur houses a large number of government aided and public schools in addition to two Kendriya Vidyalaya and Jawahar Navodaya Vidyalaya (under the Government of India). Notable private schools include: the St. Xavier's School and Guru Tegh Bahadur Public School.

== Sports facilities ==
- Nehru Stadium is the largest sports stadium in the city. It has a football ground, basketball and volleyball courts, athletic tracks, modern fully equipped gymnasium, etc. It is managed by Durgapur Steel Plant Authority.
- Sidhu Kanu Indoor Stadium houses sporting organisations and sporting associations of Burdwan district, including Durgapur Sub-divisional Women's Sports Association, School Sports Association-Durgapur Sub-division, Burdwan District Badminton Association, Burdwan District Table Tennis Association, and Burdwan District Physical Culture Association.

== Media ==
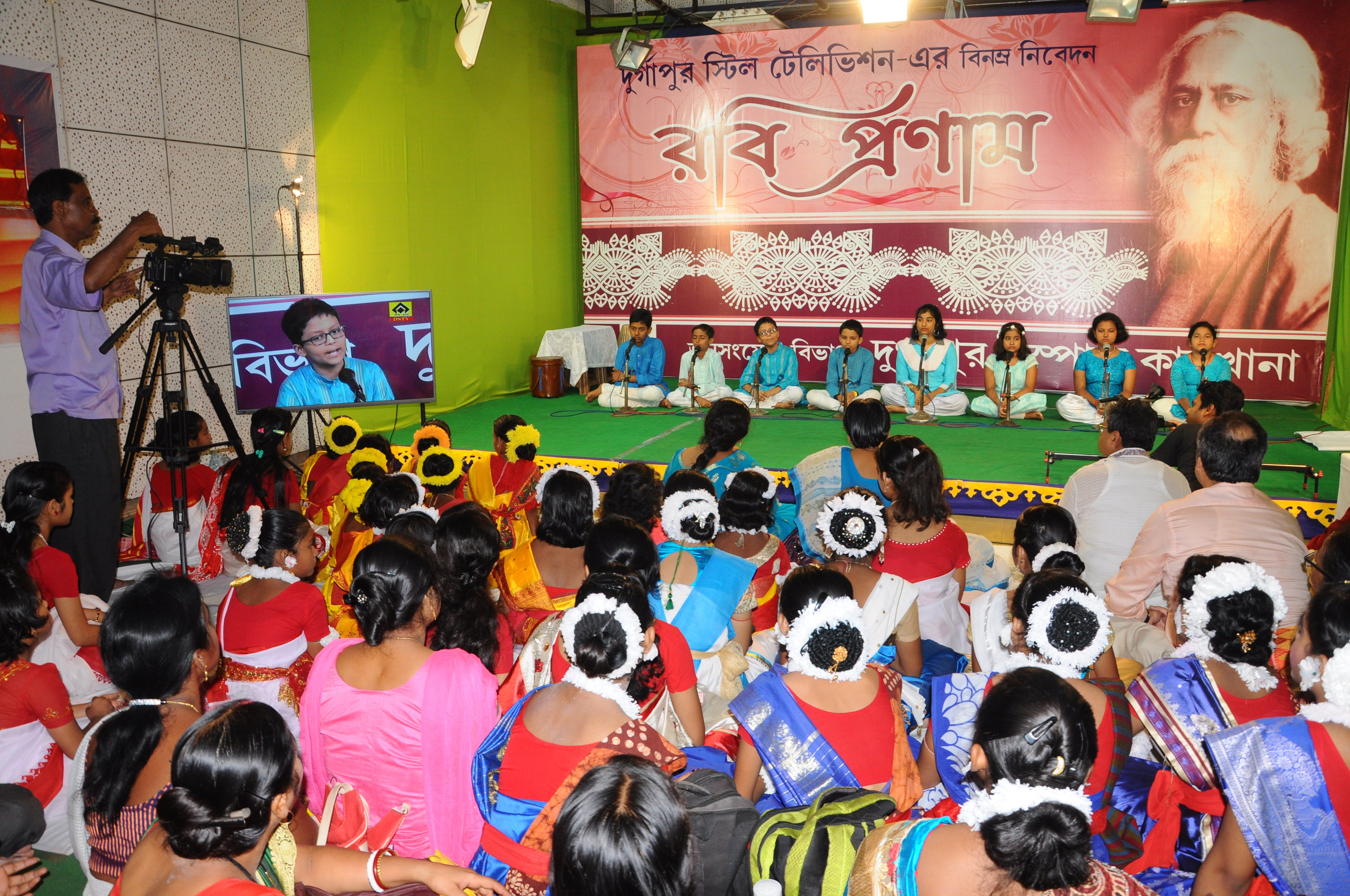
SAIL-DSP organized a cultural program to celebrate Rabindra Jayanti

Durgapur has several electronic media houses: Express News, DSTV (owned by DSP), India Hood Durgapur, Durgapur Darpan, Anandabazar Patrika is published from Ghutgoria, near Durgapur, in Bankura District. Samay Sanket is another newspaper published from Durgapur. Durgapur does not have any F.M. stations, however, All India Radio 100.3 FM, 92.7 Big FM, 93.5 Red FM, and Radio Mirchi 95 FM have stations at Asansol, and serve both Asansol and Durgapur.

== Places of Interest ==
Durgapur has some places to visit in and around the city that can make for day trips given its industrial roots as well as architectural marvels.

- Bhabani Pathak’s Tilla
- Rahreswar Shibtola
- Garh Jungle
- Ram Mandir
- Shivshakti Dham
- Ichhai Ghosher Deul
- Durgapur Barrage
- Durgapur Steel Plant
- Deul Park

== Notable people ==
- Abhisek Banerjee, Former domestic cricketer.
- Aishe Ghosh, research scholar and student leader of SFI.
- Aloke Paul, recipient of the Shanti Swarup Bhatnagar Prize for Science and Technology, Alumni of National Institute of Technology, Durgapur, Born in Durgapur.
- Ananda Gopal Mukhopadhyay, Former Politician and Leader, Indian National Congress.
- Bikash Sinha, chairman of the Board of Governors of the National Institute of Technology, Durgapur.
- Bikramjit Basu, recipient of the Shanti Swarup Bhatnagar Prize for Science and Technology, Alumni of National Institute of Technology, Durgapur.
- Bimal Mitra, Bengali Author and author of Saheb Bibi Golam.
- Dipali Saha, Politician, All India Trinamool Congress, won from Sonamukhi (Vidhan Sabha constituency), formerly within Durgapur.
- Kalipada Bauri, Former Politician who won from Gangajalghati, formerly within Durgapur from Communist Party of India (Marxist).
- Kamanio Chattopadhyay, recipient of the Shanti Swarup Bhatnagar Prize for Science and Technology, Alumni of National Institute of Technology, Durgapur.
- Lalbihari Bhattacharya, Former Politician who won from Barjora (Vidhan Sabha constituency), formerly within Durgapur from Communist Party of India (Marxist).
- Mamtaz Sanghamita, Former Member of Parliament, Bardhaman–Durgapur (Lok Sabha constituency) belonging to All India Trinamool Congress
- Mika Singh, Playback Singer and live performer.
- Mrinal Banerjee, Former Minister of Power, State of West Bengal and former leader of Communist Party of India (Marxist).
- Munmun Dutta, Film Actress.
- Nikhil Kumar Banerjee, physician and Politician belonging to All India Trinamool Congress.
- Prayas Ray Barman, Cricketer, Youngest debutant in Indian Premier League.
- Saidul Haque, Former Member of Parliament, Bardhaman–Durgapur (Lok Sabha constituency) belonging to Communist Party of India (Marxist)
- Sandip Burman, Tabla Player and Musician.
- Sri Zaheer, 12th and current dean of the Carlson School of Management, University of Minnesota.
- Subir Chowdhury, CEO and MD of JCB India.
- Sudip Chattopadhyay, developmental biologist, biotechnologist and the dean of research and consultancy at the National Institute of Technology, Durgapur.
- Sunil Kumar Mandal, Politician and Member of Parliament, Purba Bardhaman, who previously won from Galsi, within Bardhaman–Durgapur (Lok Sabha constituency), from Forward Bloc.
- S. S. Ahluwalia, Member of Parliament, Bardhaman–Durgapur (Lok Sabha constituency) belonging to Bhartiya Janata Party.
- Tushar Dutta, Classical Music Vocalist.
- Mainak Sarkar, former Computer Programmer(Deceased).
