= 2026 Durgapur Municipal Corporation election =

Upcoming Indian election in West Bengal

- TBD

All 43 seats for Durgapur Municipal Corporation 22 seats needed for a majority
- Turnout: TBD

	First party	Second party	Third party
Leader	TBD	TBD	TBD
Party	MAITC	CPI(M)	BJP
Alliance	MAITC+	LF	NDA
Last election	TBD	0	0
	Fourth party	Fifth party	Sixth party
Leader	TBD	TBD	TBD
Party	INC	NCPI	DTC
Alliance	INDIA	None	None
Last election	0	New Party	New Party
Mayor before election
Vacant
Vacant
Elected mayor
TBD
TBD

The 2026 Durgapur Municipal Corporation election will be held on 2026 tentatively to elect 43 members of the Durgapur Municipal Corporation (DMC) which governs Durgapur.

== Schedule ==
Poll event	Schedule
Notification date	
Last Date for filing nomination	
Last Date for withdrawal of nomination	
Date of poll	
Date of counting of votes	

== Parties and alliances ==
Following is a list of political parties and alliances which may contest in this election:

Party	Flag	Symbol	Leader	Alliance	No. of contesting candidates
Mamata All India Trinamool Congress (MAITC)	-		TBD	MAITC+	TBD
Communist Party of India (Marxist) (CPI(M))			TBD	Left Front	TBD
Marxist Forward Bloc (MFB)	-		TBD	Left Front	TBD
Revolutionary Communist Party of India (RCPI)	-		TBD	Left Front	TBD
Communist Party of India (CPI)			TBD	Left Front	TBD
All India Forward Bloc (AIFB)			TBD	Left Front	TBD
Revolutionary Socialist Party (RSP)			TBD	Left Front	TBD
Communist Party of India (Marxist–Leninist) Liberation (CPI(ML)L)			TBD	Left Front	TBD
Socialist Unity Centre of India (Communist) (SUCI(C))		Torch Light	TBD	Left Front	TBD
Communist Party of India (Marxist-Leninist) Mass Line (CPI(ML)ML)		-	TBD	Left Front	TBD
Communist Party of India (Marxist-Leninist) Red Star (CPI(ML)RS)		-	TBD	Left Front	TBD
West Bengal Socialist Party (WBSP)	-		TBD	Left Front	TBD
All India Secular Front (AISF)			TBD	Left Front	TBD
Social Democratic Party of India (SDPI)			TBD	Left Front	TBD
Bharatiya Janata Party (BJP)			TBD	NDA	TBD
Indian National Congress (INC)			TBD	INDIA	TBD
Nationalist Congress Party – Sharadchandra Pawar (NCP(SP))	-	-	TBD	INDIA	TBD
Aam Janata Unnayan Party (AJUP)			TBD	None	TBD
Democratic Trinamool Congress (DTC)	-		TBD	None	
Nationalist Citizens Party of India (NCPI)			TBD	None	
All India Majlis-e-Ittehadul Muslimeen (AIMIM)		kite	TBD	None	TBD
Bahujan Samaj Party (BSP)			TBD	None	TBD
Indian National League (INL)		-	TBD	None	TBD
Indian Union Muslim League (IUML)		-	TBD	None	TBD
Aazad Samaj Party (Kanshi Ram) (ASP(KR))		-	TBD	None	TBD
Independents (IND)	None			None	TBD
Others	None			None	TBD

== Candidates ==
No.	Borough	Ward				
No.	Borough	Ward	AITC+	INDIA	LF	NDA
1	I	Ward 1	AITC	INC	LF	BJP
2	I	Ward 2	AITC	INC	LF	BJP
3	I	Ward 3	AITC	INC	LF	BJP
4	I	Ward 4	AITC	INC	LF	BJP
5	I	Ward 5	AITC	INC	LF	BJP
6	I	Ward 6	AITC	INC	LF	BJP
7	I	Ward 7	AITC	INC	LF	BJP
8	I	Ward 8	AITC	INC	LF	BJP
9	I	Ward 9	AITC	INC	LF	BJP
10	I	Ward 10	AITC	INC	LF	BJP
11	I	Ward 11	AITC	INC	LF	BJP
12	I	Ward 12	AITC	INC	LF	BJP
13	III	Ward 13	AITC	INC	LF	BJP
14	III	Ward 14	AITC	INC	LF	BJP
15	II	Ward 15	AITC	INC	LF	BJP
16	II	Ward 16	AITC	INC	LF	BJP
17	II	Ward 17	AITC	INC	LF	BJP
18	II	Ward 18	AITC	INC	LF	BJP
19	II	Ward 19	AITC	INC	LF	BJP
20	II	Ward 20	AITC	INC	LF	BJP
21	IV	Ward 21	AITC	INC	LF	BJP
22	IV	Ward 22	AITC	INC	LF	BJP
23	IV	Ward 23	AITC	INC	LF	BJP
24	IV	Ward 24	AITC	INC	LF	BJP
25	IV	Ward 25	AITC	INC	LF	BJP
26	IV	Ward 26	AITC	INC	LF	BJP
27	IV	Ward 27	AITC	INC	LF	BJP
28	IV	Ward 28	AITC	INC	LF	BJP
29	III	Ward 29	AITC	INC	LF	BJP
30	III	Ward 30	AITC	INC	LF	BJP
31	III	Ward 31	AITC	INC	LF	BJP
32	III	Ward 32	AITC	INC	LF	BJP
33	III	Ward 33	AITC	INC	LF	BJP
34	III	Ward 34	AITC	INC	LF	BJP
35	III	Ward 35	AITC	INC	LF	BJP
36	V	Ward 36	AITC	INC	LF	BJP
37	V	Ward 37	AITC	INC	LF	BJP
38	IV	Ward 38	AITC	INC	LF	BJP
39	IV	Ward 39	AITC	INC	LF	BJP
40	V	Ward 40	AITC	INC	LF	BJP
41	V	Ward 41	AITC	INC	LF	BJP
42	V	Ward 42	AITC	INC	LF	BJP
43	V	Ward 43	AITC	INC	LF	BJP

== Voters Turnout ==
No. of Voters	No. of Voters who cast votes	Voters Turnout (%)

== Surveys and polls ==
=== Seat Projections ===
Name of the election	Date	AITC+	LF	NDA	INDIA	IND	Margin
2017 Durgapur Municipal Corporation election	13 August 2013	43	0	0		0	43
2019 Indian general election in West Bengal	11 April - 19 May 2019						
2021 West Bengal Legislative Assembly election	10 April 2021						
2024 Indian general election in West Bengal	1 June 2024						
2026 West Bengal Legislative Assembly election	29 April 2026						

== Result ==
=== Results by Parties ===
0
AITC

Vote share by alliance
1. AITC+ (0.00%)
2. NDA (0.00%)
3. LF (0.00%)
4. INDIA (0.00%)
5. NOTA (1.52%)
6. IND (0.00%)
7. Others (0.00%)

Alliance	Party	Seats						Popular Vote (%)		
Alliance	Party	Contested		Won		Change	Earned Second Position	Popular Vote (%)		
Alliance	Party	Party-wise	Alliance-wise	Party-wise	Alliance-wise	Change	Earned Second Position	Party-wise	Alliance-wise	Change (%)
AITC+	AITC									
NDA	BJP									
Left Front	CPI(M)									
Left Front	CPI									
Left Front	RSP									
Left Front	AIFB									
Left Front	MFB									
Left Front	RCPI									
Left Front	CPI(ML)L									
Left Front	SUCI(C)									
INDIA	INC									
INDIA	NCP-SP									
None	Independent									
None	Others									
Total Polled Votes / Voter Turnout										
Registered Voters										

=== Results by Wards ===
Results
		Winner			Runner Up			Margin
Borough	Ward number	Party	Candidate	Votes	Party	Candidate	Votes	Margin
I	Ward 1							
I	Ward 2							
I	Ward 3							
I	Ward 4							
I	Ward 5							
I	Ward 6							
I	Ward 7							
I	Ward 8							
I	Ward 9							
II	Ward 10							
II	Ward 11							
II	Ward 12							
II	Ward 15							
II	Ward 16							
II	Ward 17							
II	Ward 18							
II	Ward 19							
II	Ward 20							
III	Ward 13							
III	Ward 14							
III	Ward 29							
III	Ward 30							
III	Ward 31							
III	Ward 32							
III	Ward 33							
III	Ward 34							
III	Ward 35							
IV	Ward 21							
IV	Ward 22							
IV	Ward 23							
IV	Ward 24							
IV	Ward 25							
IV	Ward 26							
IV	Ward 27							
IV	Ward 28							
IV	Ward 38							
IV	Ward 39							
V	Ward 36							
V	Ward 37							
V	Ward 40							
V	Ward 41							
V	Ward 42							
V	Ward 43							

== See also ==
- Durgapur Municipal Corporation
- 2026 West Bengal Legislative Assembly election
- 2023 West Bengal Panchayat elections
- 2024 Indian general election in West Bengal
- 2026 elections in India
