= Apurba Mukherjee =

Indian politician

Apurba Mukherjee (born 1955) is an Indian politician from West Bengal. He is a former member of the West Bengal Legislative Assembly from Durgapur Paschim Assembly constituency in Paschim Bardhaman district. He was elected in the 2011 West Bengal Legislative Assembly election representing the All India Trinamool Congress. But lost the next election in 2016 poll.

== Early life and education ==
Mukherjee is from Durgapur, Paschim Bardhaman district, West Bengal. He is the son of late Ananda Gopal Mukherjee, a former four time MLA in the West Bengal Assembly. He completed his graduation in science at Bankura Christian College in the year 1977. His wife is a music teacher.

== Career ==
Mukherjee was elected in the Durgapur Paschim Assembly constituency representing the All India Trinamool Congress in the 2011 West Bengal Legislative Assembly election. He polled 92,454 votes and defeated his nearest rival, Biprendu Kumar Chakraborty of the Communist Party of India (Marxist), by a margin of 17,006 votes. He contested again on the Trinamool Congress ticket in the 2016 West Bengal Legislative Assembly election and polled 63,709 votes but could only finish second to Biswanath Parial of the Indian National Congress, who got 108,533 votes. He lost by a margin of 44,824 votes.
