= Sidhu Kanu Indoor Stadium =

Sidhu Kanhu Indoor Stadium
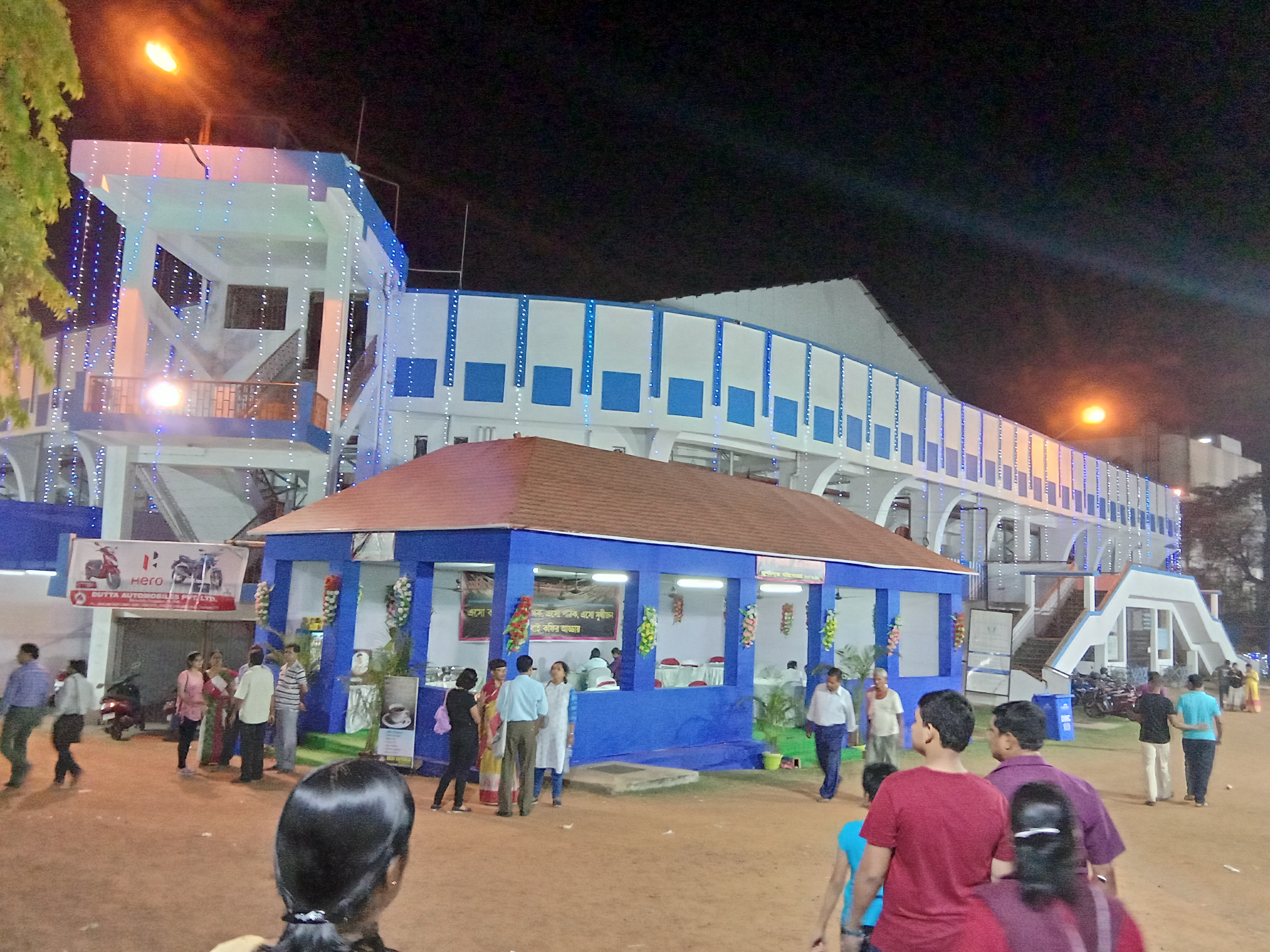
- Exterior of the stadium at night in 2019

- Location in West Bengal Sidhu Kanu Indoor Stadium (India)

General information
- Status: Completed
- Type: Indoor Stadium
- Location: Recol Park, Durgapur, West Bengal 713216, Durgapur, India
- Coordinates: 23°32′25″N 87°17′29″E
- Groundbreaking: 1970
- Completed: 1973
- Renovated: 2018
- Owner: Durgapur Municipal Corporation

Height
- Roof: Tin sloping roof

Technical details
- Floor count: 1

Design and construction
- Awards: Best indoor stadium in Eastern India

Other information
- Seating type: Plastic fixed base seats
- Seating capacity: 20000
- Parking: Available beside the stadium

Sidhu Kanhu Indoor Stadium is an indoor stadium in Durgapur, West Bengal, India. It was built by Durgapur Municipal Corporation, and has hosted matches of badminton, table tennis, and other sports. Various district and state level matches are often conducted here. It is also a favorable venue for national level games. Regular badminton coaching sessions are also held here. Table tennis is a very popular game in Durgapur; both boys and girls players of Durgapur have excelled in this game. Many players from Durgapur have represented the state. It is played and practiced in the Sidhu-Kanhu indoor stadium and many state level tournament has been played here.

This stadium houses many sporting organisation and sporting association of Burdwan district, including Durgapur Sub-divisional Women's Sports Association, School Sports Association-Durgapur Sub-division, Burdwan District Badminton Association, Burdwan District Table Tennis Association and Burdwan District Physical Culture Association

Sidhu Murmu and Kanhu Murmu were the leaders of the Santhal rebellion (1855–1856), the native rebellion in present-day Jharkhand and Bengal (Purulia and Bankura) in eastern India against both the British colonial authority and the corrupt zamindari system. The stadium is named after them.
