= DPL Thermal Power Station =

- Country: India
- Location: Durgapur, Bardhaman, West Bengal
- Coordinates: 23.5193096°N 87.3052942°E
- Status: Operational
- Commission date: 1960
- Owner: DPL

Thermal power station
- Primary fuel: Coal

Power generation
- Units operational: 2
- Nameplate capacity: 550 MW

DPL Thermal Power Station is a coal-fired thermal power station in Paschim Bardhaman district, West Bengal, which started its thermal power generation operations in 1960. The thermal power plant is located on the west side of Durgapur Station Road, and is one of the 4 coal-fired power plants in Paschim Bardhaman district.

The construction of this power plant started in the 1950s. Electricity generation from the power plant started in 1960. The thermal power plant supplies electricity to consumers by two coal-based power generation units. At present, the electricity generation capacity of the center is 550 MW.

On 1 January 2019, 100% ownership of Durgapur Projects Limited was handed over to West Bengal Power Development Corporation. Currently, DPL works as a subsidiary power generation company of the West Bengal Power Development corporation.

== History ==
=== Background ===
Durgapur city was developed by the Government of West Bengal as a new and industrial city in the state after the independence of India. Electricity demand for large, small and medium industries in Durgapur and surrounding areas continues to grow. The state government had set up DPL thermal power plants for the purpose of generating and supplying the required power.

=== 1960–2008: Old power generation units ===
Construction of the two units of the power plant began in the 1950s. Two units were commissioned in 1960, each with a power generation capacity of 30 MW. Two more units with a capacity of 77 MW were commissioned in 1964. Two years later in 1966, the fifth unit started generating electricity. The power generation capacity of the fifth unit was also 77 MW. The sixth unit was formed more than a decade later in 1987. The sixth unit was built after more than a decade in 1987. The power generation capacity of this unit was 110 MW.

=== 2008–present: New power generation units ===
The power plant has two new or advanced technology power generation units in operation. The seventh unit was built in collaboration with the Chinese company "Dong Fang Electrical Corporation", which has a power generation capacity of 300 MW. About 1,350 crore rupees were spent on the construction. Former state power minister Mrinal Banerjee inaugurated the seventh unit on 31 March 2008.

"Bharat Heavy Electricals Limited" was in charge of construction of the eighth unit. In July 2014, West Bengal Chief Minister Mamata Banerjee inaugurated the eighth unit, which is capable of generating 250 MW of electricity. But its commercial production could not be started for about a year due to various reasons. Commercial production of the eighth unit began in 2015.
