= Chandra Sekhar Banerjee =

Indian politician (born 1979)

Chandra Sekhar Banerjee (born 1979) is an Indian politician from West Bengal. He is a member of West Bengal Legislative Assembly from the Durgapur Purba Assembly constituency in Paschim Bardhaman district representing the Bharatiya Janata Party.

== Early life ==
Banerjee is from Durgapur, Paschim Bardhaman district, West Bengal. He is the son of the late Sunil Banerjee. He completed his B.A. at Barjora college, which is affiliated with Burdwan University in 2000. He and his wife run their family businesses. He declared assets worth Rs.2.2 crore in his affidavit to the Election Commission of India.

== Career ==
Banerjee won the Durgapur Purba Assembly constituency in Paschim Bardhaman district representing the Bharatiya Janata Party in the 2026 West Bengal Legislative Assembly election. He polled votes and defeated his nearest rival, Pradip Mazumdar of the All India Trinamool Congress, by a margin of 30,934 votes.
