= All India Judicial Service =

All India Judicial Service is a proposed judicial service in India.

== History ==
The proposal for an All India Judicial Service was first suggested in the Chief Justices' Conference in 1961 as a way to remove any scope for judicial or executive intervention in the appointments to the judiciary in the High Courts and the Supreme Court in India. The idea had to be shelved after some states and High Courts opposed it.

The Constitution was amended in 1976 in midst of the Emergency to provide for an AIJS under Article 312. The entire amendment was struck down by the Supreme Court for undermining the independence of judiciary, which it interpreted as violating the Constitution's basic structure. The proposal was again floated by the ruling UPA - II government in 2012 but the draft bill was shelved again after opposition from Chief Justices of the High Courts who labeled this an infringement of their independence.

== Promotional Hierarchy ==
The promotional hierarchy of "All India Judicial Service" Group 'A' gazetted officers is mentioned below (bottom to top).

- Chief Justice of Supreme Court of India
- Justice of Supreme Court of India/Chief Justice of State High Court/Chairperson of Any Tribunal/Chairperson of any Commission/Chairperson of Lokpal/Chairperson of Lokayukta /Any other judiciary related designation to be included
- Additional Justice of Supreme Court of India/Justice of State High Court/Deputy Chairperson of Any Tribunal/Vice Chairperson of any Commission/Vice Chairperson of Lokpal/Vice Chairperson of Lokayukta /Any other judiciary related designation to be included
- Additional Justice of State High Court/Member of Any Tribunal/Member of Any Commission/Member of Lokpal/Member of Lokayukta/Any other judiciary related designation to be included
- Principal District & Session Judge/Principal Judge of Family Court/Any other judiciary related designation to be included
- Additional District and Session Judge/Additional Judicial Commissioner/Judge of Family Court/Any other judiciary related designation to be included
- Chief Judicial Magistrate cum Sub-Judge/Chief Metropolitan Magistrate/Any other judiciary related designation to be included
- Additional Chief Judicial Magistrate cum Sub-Judge/Chief Metropolitan Magistrate/Civil Judge/Any other judiciary related designation to be included
- Judicial Magistrate 1st Class cum Munsif Judge/Metropolitan Magistrate /Additional Civil Judge/Any other judiciary related designation to be included
- Judicial Magistrate 2nd Class cum Munsif Judge/Metropolitan Magistrate/Any other judiciary related designation to be included (re-included)

== See also ==
- National Judicial Appointments Commission
- Three Judges Cases
- West Bengal Judicial Service
