= Durgapur Purba Assembly constituency =

Durgapur Purba
- Constituency No. 276 for the West Bengal Legislative Assembly
- Interactive Map Outlining Durgapur Purba Assembly Constituency

Constituency details
- Country: India
- Region: East India
- State: West Bengal
- District: Paschim Bardhaman
- Lok Sabha constituency: Bardhaman–Durgapur
- Established: 1962
- Total electors: 2,41,731 (2026)
- Reservation: None

Member of Legislative Assembly
- 18th West Bengal Legislative Assembly
- Incumbent Chandra Sekhar Banerjee
- Party: BJP
- Elected year: 2026

Durgapur Purba Assembly constituency is an assembly constituency in Paschim Bardhaman district in the Indian state of West Bengal.

== Overview ==
As per orders of the Delimitation Commission, No. 276 Durgapur Purba assembly constituency covers ward nos. 1 – 10, 23 – 28 of Durgapur municipal corporation and Amlajora, Gopalpur and Molandighi gram panchayats of Kanksa community development block.

As per orders of Delimitation Commission Durgapur Purba Assembly constituency is part of No. 39 Bardhaman-Durgapur (Lok Sabha constituency).

== Members of the Legislative Assembly ==
=== Durgapur ===
Year	Name	Party
1962	Ananda Gopal Mukhopadhyay	Indian National Congress
1967	Dilip Kumar Mazumdar	Communist Party of India (Marxist)
1969	Dilip Kumar Mazumdar	Communist Party of India (Marxist)
1971	Dilip Kumar Mazumdar	Communist Party of India (Marxist)
1972	Ananda Gopal Mukhopadhyay	Indian National Congress

=== Durgapur II ===
Year	Name	Party
1977	Tarun Chatterjee	Communist Party of India (Marxist)
1982	Tarun Chatterjee	Communist Party of India (Marxist)
1987	Tarun Chatterjee	Communist Party of India (Marxist)
1991	Tarun Chatterjee	Communist Party of India (Marxist)
1996	Debabrata Banerjee	Communist Party of India
2001	Apurba Mukherjee	All India Trinamool Congress
2006	Biprendu Kumar Chakraborty	Communist Party of India (Marxist)

=== Durgapur Purba ===
Year	Name	Party
2011	Dr. Nikhil Kumar Banerjee	All India Trinamool Congress
2016	Santosh Debray	Communist Party of India (Marxist)
2021	Pradip Mazumdar	All India Trinamool Congress
2026	Chandra Sekhar Banerjee	Bharatiya Janata Party

== Election results ==
=== 2026 ===
2026 West Bengal Legislative Assembly election: Durgapur Purba
Party	Candidate	Votes	%	±%
BJP	Chandra Sekhar Banerjee	108,888	50.69	▲11.48
AITC	Pradip Mazumdar	77,954	36.29	▼4.87
CPI(M)	Simanta Chatterjee	18,999	8.84	▼6.24
INC	Debesh Chakraborty	2,883	1.34	
NOTA	None of the above	2,594	1.21	▼0.15
Majority		30,934	14.4	▲12.45
Turnout		214,802	90.46	▲15.35
BJP gain from AITC		Swing		

=== 2021 ===
2021 West Bengal Legislative Assembly election: Durgapur Purba
Party	Candidate	Votes	%	±%
AITC	Pradip Mazumdar	79,303	41.16	
BJP	Col. Diptansu Chaudhury	75,557	39.21	
CPI(M)	Abhash Ray Chaudhuri	29,063	15.08	
Independent	Dipak Dhali	1,884	0.98	
NOTA	None of the above	2,628	1.36	
Majority		3,746	1.95	
Turnout		192,674	75.11	
AITC gain from CPI(M)		Swing		

=== 2016 ===
2016 West Bengal Legislative Assembly election: Durgapur Purba
Party	Candidate	Votes	%	±%
CPI(M)	Santosh Debray	84,200	44.21	−1.16#
AITC	Pradip Mazumdar	75,069	39.42	−10.90#
BJP	Akhil Mondal	23,302	12.23	+7.92#
SUCI(C)	Asit Baran Mondal	1,676	0.88	
NOTA	None of the above	3,680		
Majority		9,131	4.80	
Turnout		1,90,525	81.42	
CPI(M) gain from AITC		Swing		

.# Swing calculated on Congress+Trinamool Congress vote percentages in 2011 taken together, as well as the CPI(M) vote for Durgapur Purba constituency.

=== 2011 ===
2011 West Bengal Legislative Assembly election: Durgapur Purba
Party	Candidate	Votes	%	±%
AITC	Nikhil Kumar Banerjee	87,050	50.32	+7.18#
CPI(M)	Alpana Chowdhury	78,484	45.37	−4.46#
BJP	Lakshman Ghorui	7,449	4.31	
Majority		8,566	4.95	
Turnout		1,73,749	85.82	
AITC gain from CPI(M)		Swing	+11.64	

.# Swing calculated on Congress+Trinamool Congress vote percentages in 2006 taken together, as well as the CPI(M) vote for Durgapur II constituency.

=== 2006 ===
In 2006 assembly elections, Biprendu Kumar Chakraborty of CPI (M) won the Durgapur II seat defeating his nearest rival Apurba Mukherjee of Trinamool Congress. Contests in most years were multi cornered but only winners and runners are being mentioned. Apurba Mukherjee won the seat in 2001 defeating Debabrata Banerjee of CPI (M). In 1996, Debabrata Banerjee had won the seat defeating Malay Kanti Dutta of Congress. In 1991, Tarun Chatterjee of CPI (M) had won the seat defeating Asit Chattaraj of Congress. Tarun Chatterjee won it in 1987 defeating Narayan Hazara Chowdhury of Congress. In 1982, Tarun Chaterjee defeated Baren Roy of Congress. Tarun Chatterjee defeated Ajit Banerjee of Congress in 1977.

=== 1972 ===
Ananda Gopal Mukherjee of Congress won the Durgapur seat in 1972. Dilip Mazumdar of CPI (M) won the seat in 1971, 1969 and 1967. Ananda Gopal Mukherjee of INC won the seat in 1962.
