= National Law University and Judicial Academy, Assam =

Law school in Assam, India

- Motto: "In Pursuit of Excellence"
- Type: National Law University
- Established: 2009 (17 years ago)
- Affiliations: UGC, BCI
- Chancellor: Chief Justice of Gauhati High Court
- Vice-Chancellor: Dr. K. V. S. Sarma
- Students: 320
- Location: Guwahati, Assam, India; 26°10′21.72″N 091°45′19.44″E
- Campus: 60 acres (0.24 km^{2})
- Website: Official website

National Law University and Judicial Academy, Assam (NLUJA or NLUJAA) is a National Law University located in Guwahati, Assam, India. It was established in 2009 through an Act passed by the State Legislature of Assam (Assam Act XXV of 2009) as a public university dedicated to the field of legal education.

The admissions for the first batch were made in 2011 which passed out in 2016. The first vice-chancellor of the university was Gurjeet Singh, currently the university is managed by the newly appointed Vice-Chancellor K.V.S Sarma succeeding V.K Ahuja in 2024.

== History ==
The northeastern region of India has traditionally been one of the underdeveloped and marginalized areas of the Indian nation. In 2009, despite the presence of a High Court for the eight 'Seven Sister' states, viz., Arunachal Pradesh, Assam, Manipur, Meghalaya, Mizoram, Nagaland, Sikkim, Tripura in Guwahati; the scenario of legal education in the area remained far from the potential of possible proliferation of excellence in the realm of legal profession. Thus, to fulfill the aspirations of the people, the Government of Assam decided to initiate and facilitate the establishment of a Law University in Assam. This led to the establishment of The National Law University and Judicial Academy (NLUJAA), Assam by the Government of Assam by way of passing the National Law School and Judicial Academy, Assam Act, 2009 (Act No. XXV of 2009). This Act was later amended as the National Law University and Judicial Academy, Assam (Amendment) Act, 2011 (Act II of 2012), wherein the word 'School' was replaced by the word 'University'.

== Campus ==
The campus of National Law University and Judicial Academy, spread over 60 acres, it is situated in the locality of Amingaon, a municipality on the outskirts of Guwahati City. The campus houses, Academic Building, Administrative building as well as the halls of residence for boys and girls. It also houses the Conference Hall, the Moot Court Hall, the Dining Hall, a Multipurpose Gymnasiums and the library. In its library, the university has a collection of more than nine thousand printed titles and more than two hundred e-books covering law, social sciences and humanities. It also has a collection of Law Journals, both printed and electronic. The library also has access to LexisNexis, Manupatra, Westlaw, SCC Online, Cambridge Book Online, JSTOR, Hein Online, and Elgar Online.

== Centres for excellence ==
The university has established nineteen fully equipped centres of excellence for legal studies. These centres are unique in its approach to legal research, credence provided by the fact that, CARTHL established in collaboration with ICRC is a first of a kind in North East India, CCR established by UNICEF is only the second such centre on Child Rights in India after NLSIU; CIPRS is the second centre on IPR after Tezpur University in North East India, a few notable ones.

- Centre for Advanced Research in International Humanitarian Law [CARTHL]
- Centre for Child Rights [CCR]
- Centre for Constitutional Law and Governance [CCLG]
- Centre for Corporate Law and Good Governance [CCLGG]
- Centre for Criminal Justice Administration and Human Rights
- Centre for Disability Rights and Health Laws
- Centre for Disaster Management and Law
- Centre for Environment Law [CEL]
- Centre for Family Law and Customary Studies
- Centre for Human Rights and Refugee Law
- Centre for International Law [CIL]
- Centre for IPR Studies [CIPRS]
- Centre for Law Language and Culture
- Centre for Natural Resources Laws
- Centre for Peace Resolution Studies
- Centre for Post-Graduate Legal Studies [CPGLS]
- Centre for Socio-Legal Research and Gender Studies [CSLRGS]
- Centre for Studies of North East, South Asia and South East Asia Legal Studies
- Centre for Tribal and Land Rights

== Ranking ==
University rankings

Law – India
- NIRF (2021): 20

In 2021 the institute was ranked 20 among the law universities by NIRF.

In 2023 the institute was ranked 28 among the law universities by NIRF.

== Academics ==
=== Academic programmes ===
==== Undergraduate ====
NLUJA, Assam offers B.A., LL.B. (Hons.) Five-Year Integrated Programme. It follows the semester system. The entire five-year course is divided into ten semesters.

==== Post-graduate courses ====
NLUJA, Assam offers One Year Post-Graduation Course (LL.M.) with specialization in:

- Business Law
- Constitutional Law
- Consumer Protection Law
- Criminal Law
- Environmental Law
- Human Rights Law
- Intellectual Property Law
- International Law

The institution had been a partner institute for Surana & Surana National Trial Advocacy Moot Court Competition. The institute concluded an MoU with the Shastri Indo-Canadian Institute. The institute has concluded various MoUs with different institutes of national as well as international repute, for the purpose of teaching and training in the fields of law and administration, Assam Administrative Staff College, India International Institute of Diplomacy and Election Management (a constituent institute of Election Commission of India). The Law University became the first NLU to formalize an MoU with IDIA (an organization for teaching and training the underprivileged section of the society).

==== Ph.D. ====
NLUJA, Assam also has a research degree programme and around 15 scholars are currently working towards their doctoral degrees.

=== Publications ===
University currently publishes two official bi-annual journals one run by student editors and other by faculty editors. National Law University Assam Law Review (NLUALR) is a four-student edited Journal and National Law University Assam Law and Policy Review (NLUALPR) is a faculty edited peer reviewed journal. The university started its own student magazine, "The Lost Stories" in May 2017 showcasing the creative skills from the field of photography, literature, and poetry. In 2019, the students started NLUJA Echoes as the official literary magazine of the university. The Centre for Child Rights (CCR) publishes a bi-annual peer reviewed journal titled Child Rights Law and Policy Review.

== See also ==
- Legal education in India
- List of law schools in India
- West Bengal Judicial Academy
