= Nehru Stadium, Durgapur =

Stadium in Durgapur, India

Nehru Stadium
- Location in West Bengal, India Nehru Stadium (India)
- Full name: Jawaharlal Nehru Stadium
- Former names: Jawaharlal Nehru Stadium
- Location: Vidyasagar Avenue, B-Zone, Durgapur- 713205, West Bengal
- Coordinates: 23.5654°N 87.3032°E
- Capacity: 10,000

Construction
- Groundbreaking: 1974
- Opened: 1974

Website
- CricketArchive

Nehru Stadium is a multi-purpose stadium in Durgapur, West Bengal. The ground is mainly used for organizing football and cricket matches. It is operated and owned by Durgapur Steel Plant Sports Association and mainly used for football purposes. The stadium was used for cricket 1975 to 1995 for some women's cricket and under-19s matches.

The stadium has facilities to host matches for tennis, badminton, table tennis, basketball, skating, jogging track, cricket, football, swimming, squash, and gym.

A big show is held on Republic Day and Sail Day.
