= West Bengal Judicial Academy =

Institute in West Bengal

- Type: Registered Society
- Established: 2005
- Director: Sri Kundan Kumar Kumai
- Location: (India) Kolkata, West Bengal, India
- Campus: urban, 5 acres
- Affiliations: Calcutta High Court
- Website: wbja.nic.in
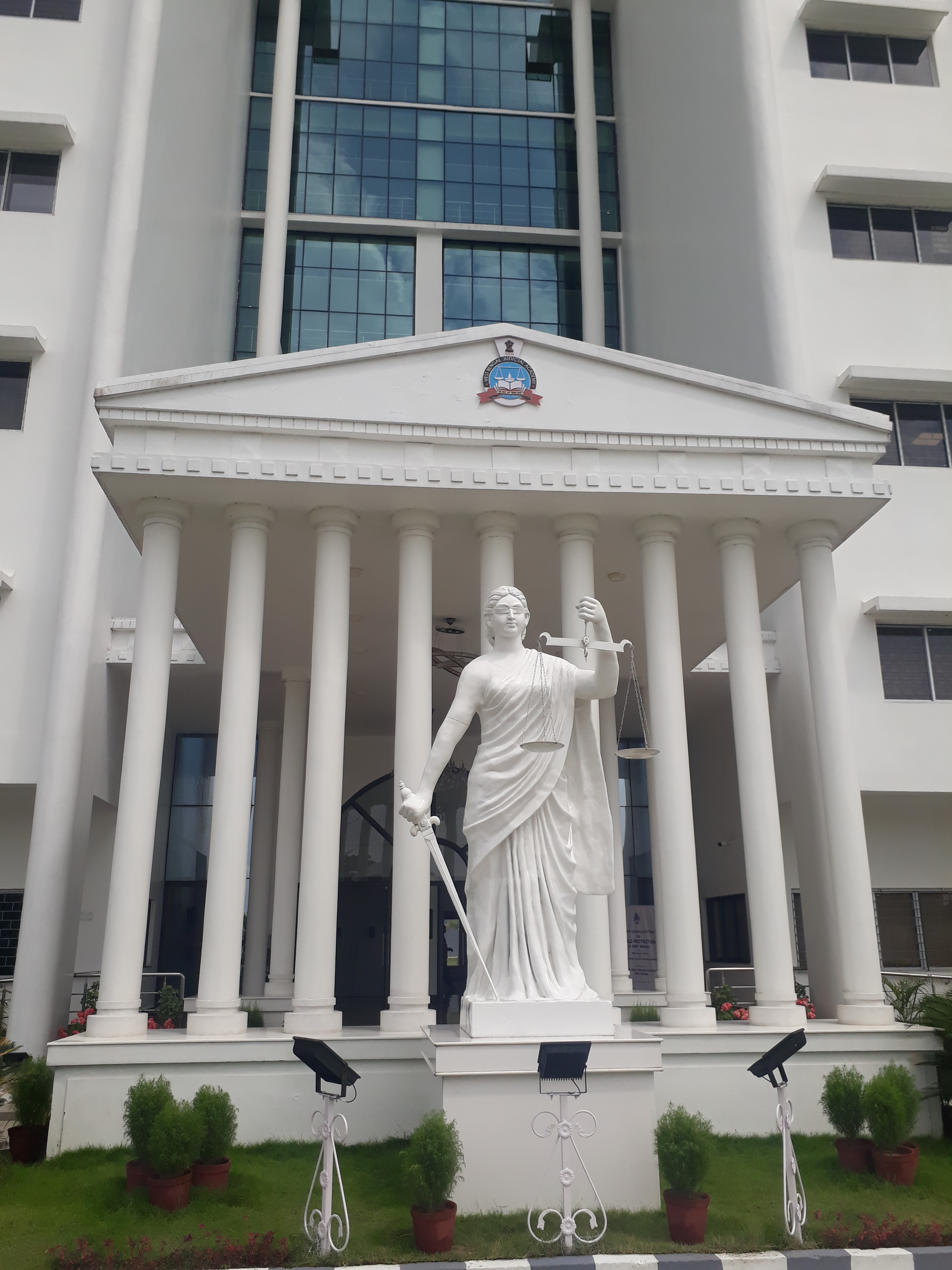

West Bengal Judicial Academy is a training institution for the Judges of the Indian state of West Bengal and officers of the West Bengal Judicial Service. The institution organises Induction Level Training for newly appointed Judicial Officers as well as entry level District Judges of West Bengal.

== History ==
The Law Commission of India recommended to establish Judicial academies in various state of India for training of all Judges of the subordinate Judiciary. Subsequently, the Supreme Court of India accepted those recommendations and on 28 February Calcutta High Court issued a notification to set up a state Judicial Academy under the name of West Bengal Judicial Academy. On 3 September 2005, the Chief Justice of India Mr. Justice Y.K. Sabharwal inaugurated the Academy in Kolkata. Initially it was started in Bijan Bhawan, Salt Lake but latter transferred to a new campus in Action Area - III of New Town.

== See also ==
- National Judicial Academy (India)
- National Law University and Judicial Academy, Assam
