= Durgapur Government College =

Government college in Durgapur, India

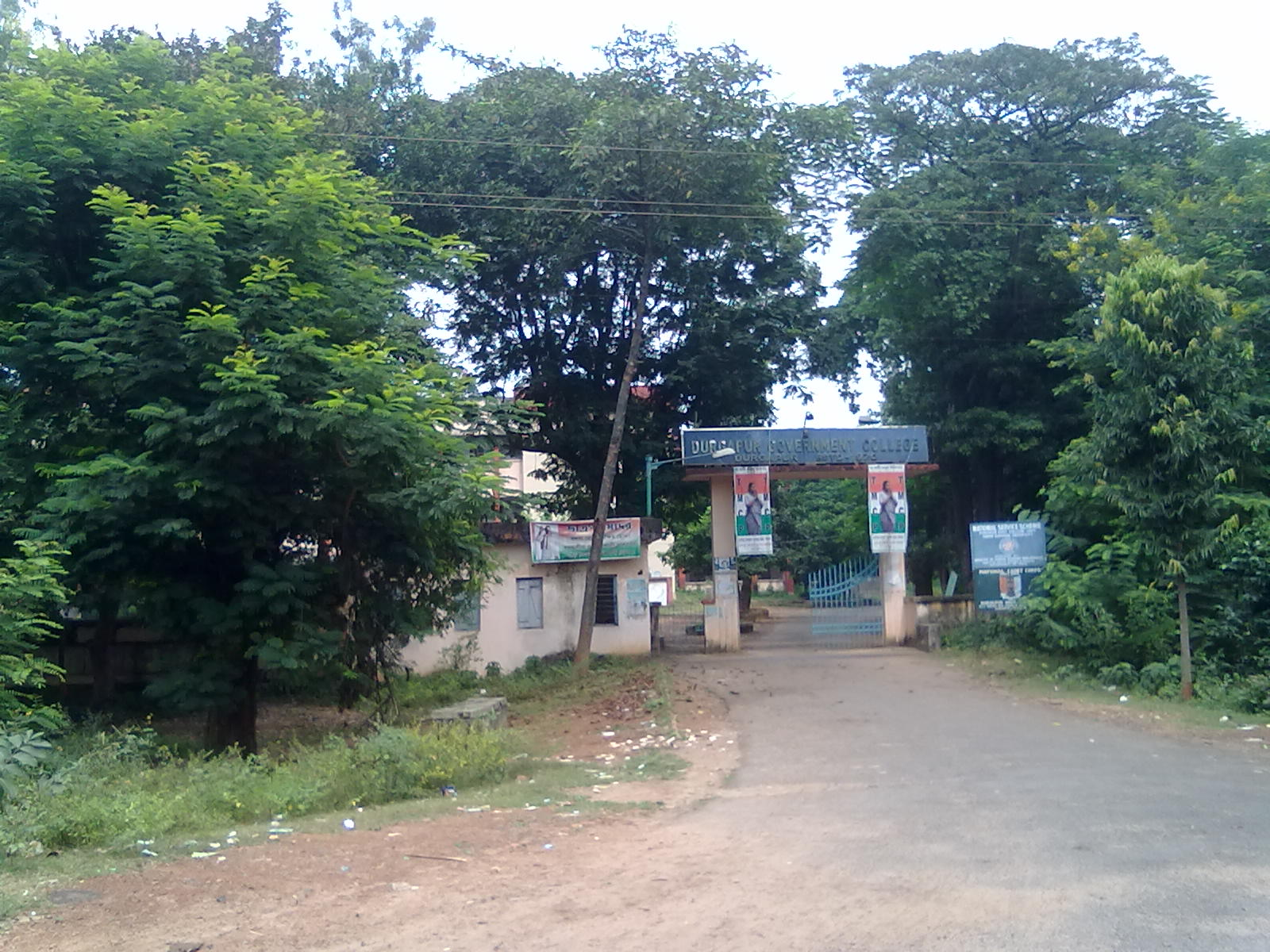
- Type: College (co-educational)
- Established: 1970; 56 years ago
- Affiliations: Kazi Nazrul University, Asansol
- Location: Jawahar Lal Nehru Road, Amarabati Colony, Durgapur, West Bengal, 713214, India; 23°32′34.01″N 87°19′29.40″E
- Campus: Urban
- Website: https://durgapurgovtcollege.ac.in/

- Location in West Bengal Durgapur Government College (India)

Durgapur Government College, India, is the only government college not only in the home district of Paschim Bardhaman, but also in the neighbouring districts of Bankura, Purulia and Birbhum. It was established on 15 September 1970. It is affiliated to Kazi Nazrul University. It is funded and administered by the Government of West Bengal. Direct administrative control lies with the Director of Public Instruction, Higher Education Directorate, Government of West Bengal.

The college offers 3-year undergraduate degree courses in Arts, Science and Commerce as well as postgraduate courses in Geology, Conservation Biology and Chemistry.

== History ==
The Government of West Bengal established Durgapur Government College in 1970. It was the period of genesis of Durgapur itself, an industrial town that was being built around a host of large and medium scale industries in the public and private sectors like the Durgapur Steel Plant, Alloy Steel Plant, Mining and Allied Machinery Corporation, Durgapur Projects Limited, Phillips Carbon Black Limited, Alstom etc. With the settlement of many thousands of industrial workers of all ranks in Durgapur, the need was felt for a higher education institution that would offer to students Degree Courses.

== Real-time weather reporting ==
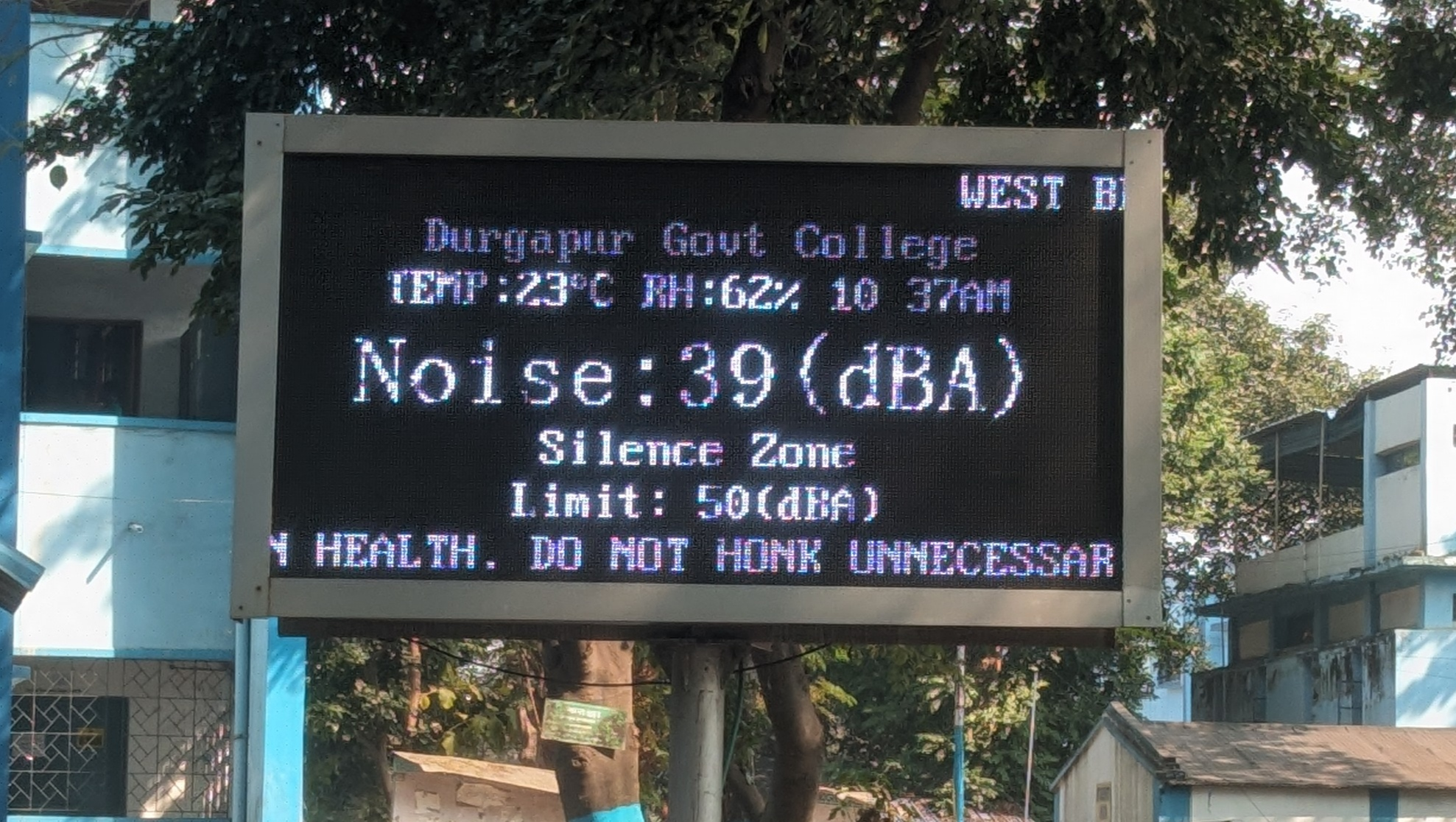
Air quality index board at Durgapur Government College

The Geography Department started real-time weather reporting of Durgapur.

== Library ==
The College Central Library is a separate building with over 80,000 books, journals and periodicals and internet facility. Besides the central library, each department offers books and journals to the departmental Honours and postgraduate students through the departmental Seminar Library.

== Laboratory ==
The college has laboratories with all the science departments, as well as with the postgraduate Department of Geology, Conservation Biology and Chemistry.

Chemistry Lab. Physics Lab. DMLP Microscope at Geology Dept.

== Computers ==
Computer facility is available in almost all the science departments, as well as in the library. A separate computer lab is present at the Department of Geology, where the terminals are interconnected by LAN. Broadband internet facility is provided to the teachers and the students by the Library computers. Computer lab, Geology Dept. Computer lab, Chemistry Dept.

== Common Room ==
There are separate common rooms for the girls and boys students, both equipped with indoor games facilities. Journals, magazines and newspapers are subscribed to and kept in the common rooms for the use of students.

== Gymnasium ==
The college has a multi-gym facility for the use and benefit of its students.

== Students' Union ==
The Students’ Union of the college, consisting of elected students-members, is a representative body of all the students including the postgraduate students. The election to the union is held every year. The Students’ Union publishes the college magazine (SHAMIDH) and a wall magazine (UNMESH). It promotes activities relating to the students’ welfare, Annual social function, Fresher's welcome, Annual college exhibition and development of the college.

Students can participate in the cultural and extracurricular activities that the Students’ Union organizes. Students’ Union organizes a Career Fest and an annual exhibition on academic matters. Students’ Union also cooperates with the college authority to organize the annual athletic meet. The body organizes the popular annual social function and the Fresher's Welcome.

There is a Consumers’ Co-operative organized by the Students’ Union to supply books and stationery to the students at subsidized rates. Students can use Xerox and Payphone facilities provided by the Co-operative.

== College journal ==
Durgapur Government College publishes an academic journal titled Communique. The journal provides members of the staff and students a platform to engage with academic and intellectual issues.

The Department of Geology publishes an academic journal titled ‘Geolozine’. It serves as a medium through which to present geological research as conducted by the faculties, researchers and students of the department.

== M.Sc. Course in Geology ==
The Department of Geology offers two years full-time M.Sc. in Geology under Kazi Najrul University. The course was introduced in 1983 with an intake capacity of 10 and at present the intake capacity is 20. Almost all the M.Sc. Final year students got appointed by reputed concerns before completion of their course.

== M.Sc. Course in Conservation Biology ==
This multidisciplinary course has been introduced in 2007 and students with an Honours background in Life Sciences with Chemistry as a combination subject can join.

== Alumni association ==
The alumni association of the college gives an award named "The student who inspires us most" every year to one of the existing students. There is a separate Alumni Association of the Geology Department which organizes a biennial alumni meet where ex-students and current students exchange views about academic issues and employment opportunities. This association is also instrumental in publishing a journal every alternate year. The association has placed 22 M.Sc. students in organizations like Baker Hughes, Rolta India, HCCL, Integrity Geosciences, SWID, Geoservices, SRG Services, Bankura District Rural Development Cell, etc.

== Sports and games ==
The Physical Education Department organizes games (indoor and outdoor) and athletic activities. The college was runners up in football, table tennis and badminton in the Intergovernmental College Tournament of 2005. In the athletic section one of its female students of B.Com. 1st year, stood 1st in 200m and 400m race and 3rd in shot put. She was declared Best Sportswoman in Inter-Governmental College Athletic Meet 2006. In the men's section the males of B.A. 1st Year stood 1st in the 200m and 400m races and in the shot put while a B.A 3rd year student stood 2nd in 800m race in Inter-Governmental College Athletic Meet 2006.

== Healthy practices ==
=== National Cadet Corps ===
The National Cadet Corps (NCC) wing of the college are active in mobilizing students to take up personality-building activities, make them aware of social responsibilities and train them to become an honest citizen. The wings are headed by professionally trained personnel among teachers.

=== National Service Scheme ===
The NSS wing of this college is active. Nearly 100 students every year come forward to join NSS and over the year work for the social causes. Activities include campus-cleaning, forestation programmes, health awareness activities like AIDS awareness, polio immunization works, and literacy programmes. Volunteers conduct annual ten-day-long camps in economically backward areas to inculcate the importance of literacy, creative activities amongst the children and health awareness.

The NSS programme of the college educates adult women and school dropouts in slum areas.

=== Cell for Gender Sensitization and Sexual Harassment Protection ===
As the college is committed to provide to all its students and employees an environment that is gender equitable, it has a Cell for Gender Sensitization and Sexual Harassment Protection. The cell was constituted along the guidelines prescribed by the honourable Supreme Court of India. The cell aims to inculcate gender sensitivity amongst all the stakeholders of the college.

=== Grievance Cell ===
This is a centralized cell to look into the grievances relating to infrastructure, academics and support systems. The mandate of the cell is to address grievances in an efficient and swift manner.

=== Instrumentation Maintenance Facility (IMF) ===
Under the Instrumentation Maintenance Facility (IMF) of the UGC the college will receive funds to appoint personnel on a contract basis for the maintenance of equipment and infrastructure.

=== Career Planning and Placement Cell ===
The college has a Career Planning and Placement Cell where students are provided guidance in career choice, opportunities for higher education, besides being provided placement opportunities in organizations and assistance to develop soft skills required by the job-market. Employers give presentations to the students and conduct on-campus interviews leading to placement.

== Accreditation ==
Durgapur Government College has been awarded A grade by the National Assessment and Accreditation Council (NAAC). The college is recognized by the University Grants Commission (UGC).

== See also ==
- List of institutions of higher education in West Bengal
- Education in India
- Education in West Bengal
