= Santosh Debray =

Indian politician

Member of the West Bengal Legislative Assembly
- In office 2016–2021
- Preceded by: Nikhil Kumar Banerjee
- Succeeded by: Pradip Mazumdar
- Constituency: Durgapur Purba

Personal details
- Party: CPIM
- Education: Umakanta Academy
- Profession: Politician, Ex. WBPS Officer

Santosh Debray is an Indian politician from West Bengal. He was elected as a Member of the Legislative Assembly in 2016 West Bengal Legislative Assembly election from Durgapur Purba, as a member of the CPIM.
