= Biswanath Parial =

Indian politician

Biswanath Parial (born 1966) is an Indian politician from West Bengal. He is a former member of the West Bengal Legislative Assembly from Durgapur Paschim Assembly constituency in Paschim Bardhaman district. He was elected in the 2016 West Bengal Legislative Assembly election representing the Indian National Congress. On 18.04.2026 he joined Bharatiya Janata Party in presence of Dr.Sukanta Majumdar

== Early life and education ==
Parial is from Durgapur, Paschim Bardhaman district, West Bengal. He is the son of late Dulal Parial. He studied Class 12 and passed the Higher Secondary Examinations conducted by the West Bengal Board of Secondary Education in 1988. His wife Ruma Parial is a teacher.

== Career ==
Parial was elected in the Durgapur Paschim Assembly constituency representing the Indian National Congress in the 2016 West Bengal Legislative Assembly election. He polled 108,533 votes and defeated his nearest rival and sitting MLA, Apurba Mukherjee of the All India Trinamool Congress, by a margin of 44,824 votes. Later, he shifted to the All India Trinamool Congress and contested the 2021 West Bengal Legislative Assembly election on the Trinamool Congress ticket but lost to the Bharatiya Janata Party candidate Lakshman Chandra Ghorui by a margin of 14,664 votes. He polled 76,522 votes against 91,186 votes garnered by the winner Lakshman Chandra Ghorui.
