= Durgapur Paschim Assembly constituency =

Assembly constituency in West Bengal, India

Durgapur Paschim
- Constituency No. 277 for the West Bengal Legislative Assembly
- Interactive Map Outlining Durgapur Paschim Assembly Constituency

Constituency details
- Country: India
- Region: East India
- State: West Bengal
- District: Paschim Bardhaman
- Lok Sabha constituency: Bardhaman–Durgapur
- Established: 1962
- Total electors: 2,38,700 (2026)
- Reservation: None

Member of Legislative Assembly
- 18th West Bengal Legislative Assembly
- Incumbent Lakshman Chandra Ghorui
- Party: BJP
- Alliance: NDA
- Elected year: 2026

Durgapur Paschim Assembly constituency is an assembly constituency in Paschim Bardhaman district in the Indian state of West Bengal.

== Overview ==
As per orders of the Delimitation Commission, No. 277 Durgapur Paschim assembly constituency covers ward nos. 11 – 22 and 29 – 43 of Durgapur municipal corporation.

As per orders of Delimitation Commission Durgapur Paschim Assembly constituency is part of No. 39 Bardhaman-Durgapur (Lok Sabha constituency).

== Members of the Legislative Assembly ==
Election	Member	Party
Durgapur I
1977	Dilip Mazumdar	Communist Party of India (Marxist)
1982	Dilip Mazumdar	Communist Party of India (Marxist)
1987	Dilip Mazumdar	Communist Party of India (Marxist)
1991	Dilip Mazumdar	Communist Party of India (Marxist)
1996	Mrinal Banerjee	Communist Party of India (Marxist)
2001	Mrinal Banerjee	Communist Party of India (Marxist)
2006	Mrinal Banerjee	Communist Party of India (Marxist)
2010^	Archana Bhattacharya	Communist Party of India (Marxist)
Durgapur Paschim
2011	Apurba Mukherjee	Trinamool Congress
2016	Biswanath Parial	Indian National Congress
2021	Lakshman Chandra Ghorui	Bharatiya Janata Party
2026	Lakshman Chandra Ghorui	Bharatiya Janata Party

== Election results ==
=== 2026 ===
2026 West Bengal Legislative Assembly election: Durgapur Paschim
Party	Candidate	Votes	%	±%
BJP	Lakshman Chandra Ghorui	114,729	52.93	▲6.62
AITC	Kabi Dutta	77,131	35.58	▼3.28
CPI(M)	Pravash Sain	13,986	6.45	
INC	Tarun Roy	3,019	1.39	▼7.77
NOTA	None of the above	2,947	1.36	▲0.03
Majority		37,598	17.35	▲9.9
Turnout		216,774	90.71	▲17.59
BJP hold		Swing		

=== 2021 ===
2021 West Bengal Legislative Assembly election: Durgapur Paschim
Party	Candidate	Votes	%	±%
BJP	Lakshman Chandra Ghorui	91,186	46.31	
AITC	Biswanath Parial	76,522	38.86	
INC	Debesh Chakraborty	18,030	9.16	
Independent	Nayan Mondal	2,130	1.08	
Independent	Chandra Mallika Bandopadhyay	2,038	1.04	
NOTA	None of the above	2,624	1.33	
Majority		14,664	7.45	
Turnout		196,902	73.12	
BJP gain from INC		Swing		

=== 2016 ===
West Bengal assembly elections, 2016: Durgapur Paschim
Party	Candidate	Votes	%	±%
INC	Biswanath Parial	108,533		
AITC	Apurba Mukherjee	63,709		
BJP	Kalyan Dubey	18313		
SUCI(C)	Shyamali Banerjee (Roy Choudhuri)	1917		
BSP	Sandip Sarkar	1,506		
Independent	Kanai Dutta	839		
Bahujan Mukti Party	Atul Chandra Bauri	679		
NOTA	None of the above	3, 879		
Turnout				
INC gain from AITC		Swing		

=== 2011 ===
Apurba Mukherjee emerged victorious by defeating his nearest rival Biprendu Kumar Chakraborty

West Bengal assembly elections, 2011: Durgapur Paschim
Party	Candidate	Votes	%	±%
AITC	Apurba Mukherjee	92,454	51.94	
CPI(M)	Biprendu Kumar Chakraborty	75,448	42.38	−17.52#
BJP	Kalyan Dubey	5,434	3.05	
JD(U)	Sunil Yadab	2,859		
BSP	Sandip Sarkar	1,813		
Turnout		178,008	85.36	
AITC gain from CPI(M)		Swing	#	

.# Change for CPI(M) calculated on the basis of its vote percentage in 2006 in Durgapur I constituency. Trinamool Congress did not contest the seat in 2006.

=== 2010 ===
In the by-election, caused by the death of sitting MLA, Mrinal Banerjee, held in July 2010, Archana Bhattacharya of CPI(M) defeated Bansi Badan Karmakar of Congress. Contests in most years were multi cornered but only winners and runners are being mentioned. Mrinal Banerjee of CPI (M) won the Durgapur I seat in 2006, 2001, and 1996 defeating Congress candidates Banshi Badan Karmakar, Chandra Sekhar Banerjee and Mrigendranath Pal respectively. Dilip Mazumdar of CPI (M) won the seat in 1991, 1987, 1982 and 1977.

=== 1972 ===
Ananda Gopal Mukhopadhyay of Congress won the Durgapur seat in 1972. Dilip Mazumdar of CPI (M) won the seat in 1971, 1969 and 1967. Ananda Gopal Mukhopadhyay of INC won the seat in 1962.
