= Mrinal Banerjee =

Indian politician

Minister for Power & Labour
- In office 1996–2010
- Succeeded by: Anadi Kumar Sahu
- Constituency: Durgapur I

MLA
- In office 1996–2010
- Preceded by: Dilip Mazumder
- Succeeded by: Archana Bhattacharya
- Constituency: Durgapur I

Personal details
- Born: 10 January 1938
- Died: 3 February 2010 (aged 72) Dhakuria, Kolkata, West Bengal, India
- Cause of death: Colorectal cancer
- Party: CPI(M)

Mrinal Banerjee (1938 – 3 February 2010) was Power Minister in the Left Front Ministry in the Indian state of West Bengal.

He had joined politics as an employee of Durgapur Steel Plant. In spite of his qualifying as an associate member of the Institute of Engineers, he preferred to remain a worker and serve the trade union. He was general secretary of the Steel Workers Federation of India and secretary of the West Bengal State Committee of the Centre of Indian Trade Unions. In 1996, Jyoti Basu inducted him into the state cabinet as Minister for Industrial Reconstruction and State Public Undertakings.

He was elected on a CPI(M) ticket from the Durgapur I assembly constituency in 1996, 2001 and 2006.
