= Durgapur Municipal Corporation =

Local civic body in Durgapur, West Bengal, India

Durgapur Municipal Corporation দুর্গাপুর নগর নিগম
- Seal of the Durgapur Municipal Corporation

Type
- Type: Municipal Corporation

History
- Founded: 1994; 32 years ago

Leadership
- Mayor: Vacant since 2022
- Deputy Mayor: Vacant since 2022
- Chairperson: Vacant since 2022
- Seats: 43

Elections
- Last election: 2017
- Next election: 2025

Meeting place
- Headquarters of the Durgapur Municipal Corporation

Website
- www.durgapurmunicipalcorporation.org

Durgapur Municipal Corporation (DMC) is the civic body that governs Durgapur in Durgapur subdivision of Paschim Bardhaman district, West Bengal, India.

== History ==
The Durgapur Notified Area (DNA) was formed in 1962 surrounding the areas in and around the Gopinathpur area and the halt station named Durgapur. The governing body got its name from the railway station. The formation of the Durgapur Steel Plant, an integrated steel plant and its steel township in late 1950 by the then chief minister of West Bengal, Dr. Bidhan Chandra Roy, heralded the rapid development of the region. Plenty of industries were set up at that time in Durgapur. As a result plenty of people from adjoining areas came to newly formed city to try their luck for a job in the city's hoard of Industries. By 1994 the city was thickly populated. Seeing this an act was passed to change the existing Durgapur Notified Area (DNA) to a Municipal Corporation and thus came into existence the present Durgapur Municipal Corporation governing a total area of 157 km^{2} and a population of total of 5.81 lakhs (according to the 2011 census).
