= Pradip Mazumdar =

Indian politician

Cabinet Minister, Government of West Bengal
- In office 3 August 2022 – 7 May 2026
- Governor: La. Ganesan; C. V. Ananda Bose
- Chief Minister: Mamata Banerjee
- Department: •Panchayats and Rural Development
- Preceded by: Subrata Mukherjee

Member of the West Bengal Legislative Assembly
- In office 2 May 2021 – 4 May 2026
- Preceded by: Santosh Debray
- Succeeded by: Chandra Sekhar Banerjee
- Constituency: Durgapur Purba

Personal details
- Party: AITC
- Profession: Politician

Pradip Mazumdar is an Indian politician member of All India Trinamool Congress. He is an MLA, elected from the Durgapur Purba constituency in the 2021 West Bengal Legislative Assembly election. He was appointed the "Minister in Charge", Government of West Bengal for the "Panchayats and Rural Development" under the Third Banerjee Ministry.

Early life and education

Mazumdar was born on 8 October 1946 into a Congress-affiliated family in West Bengal. He completed his undergraduate degree in Agricultural Science with Engineering (Honours) from University of Kalyani in 1970. He later earned a Master’s degree in Agricultural Extension from Bidhan Chandra Krishi Vishwavidyalaya in 1977. He also holds a Diploma in Management, along with all his academic credentials.

Corporate and professional career

Mazumdar began his professional career with ICI, where he worked extensively in agricultural development across India, Europe, and the Asia-Pacific region. He played a key role in the establishment of Zeneca ICI Ltd., becoming a director in 1995 and CEO and Managing Director from 1998.

Following the merger of Zeneca with Novartis, he joined the board of Syngenta Crop Protection Ltd. in 2000 and was a Founder Director of Syngenta Bio-Science (P) Ltd. until 2008.

He also been:

- Chairman, CropLife India (until September 2006), later appointed Chairman Emeritus
- Chairman, Agriculture Policy Group (from 2007)
- Member, CII Agriculture Council (2003–2006)

His work focused on sustainable agricultural practices, agri-technology policy, and rural economic growth.

Advisory roles in West Bengal Government

In November 2011, Mazumdar was invited by the newly elected state government to assist in developing a growth roadmap for West Bengal’s rural sector. He was appointed Advisor (Agriculture & Allied Sectors) to the Chief Minister with effect from 1 April 2012.

He subsequently became a Member of the Public Policy and Planning Board, West Bengal, and was appointed Chairman of the West Bengal Agro Industries Corporation Limited in 2016, a position he again assumed in May 2021. His advisory responsibilities included coordination across agriculture, fisheries, food processing, co-operation, and rural development departments.
