= Lakshman Chandra Ghorui =

Indian politician

Member of the West Bengal Legislative Assembly
- Incumbent
- Assumed office 2 May 2021
- Preceded by: Biswanath Parial
- Constituency: Durgapur Paschim

Personal details
- Party: Bharatiya Janata Party
- Education: 12th Pass
- Profession: Businessman

Lakshman Chandra Ghorui is an Indian politician from Bharatiya Janata Party. In May 2021, he was elected as a member of the West Bengal Legislative Assembly from Durgapur Paschim (constituency). He defeated Biswanath Parial of All India Trinamool Congress by 14,664 votes in 2021 West Bengal Assembly election.
