= Nikhil Kumar Banerjee =

Indian politician

MLA of Durgapur Purba
- In office 2011–2016
- Preceded by: Biprendu Kumar Chakraborty
- Succeeded by: Santosh Debray

Personal details
- Born: 1949/50
- Party: All India Trinamool Congress

Nikhil Kumar Banerjee was an Indian physician and politician belonging to All India Trinamool Congress. He was elected as a legislator in West Bengal Legislative Assembly from Durgapur Purba in 2011. He died on 15 November 2017 at the age of 67.
