= West Bengal Judicial Service =

Service in India

West Bengal Judicial Service, popularly known as W.B.J.S. is the Judicial service of the Indian state of West Bengal. For the WBJS, Public Service Commission, West Bengal arranges competitive examinations in three phases time to time. These phases are Preliminary, Mains and Personality Test. This service was renamed after West Bengal Civil Service (Judicial).

== Postings ==
West Bengal Judicial Service officers are placed either in the post of Civil Judge (Junior division) or First Class Judicial Magistrate under the Government of West Bengal. The officers may be promoted as the District Judge and even Judge of the Calcutta High Court upon seniority basis.

== Training ==
Training of newly recruited Judicial Officers was conducted by the West Bengal Judicial Academy. The academy arranges for Induction Level Training for Judicial Service officers posted as Civil Judge (Junior Division) and Judicial Magistrates in the State.
