= Durgapur Steel Plant =

Steel plant of India

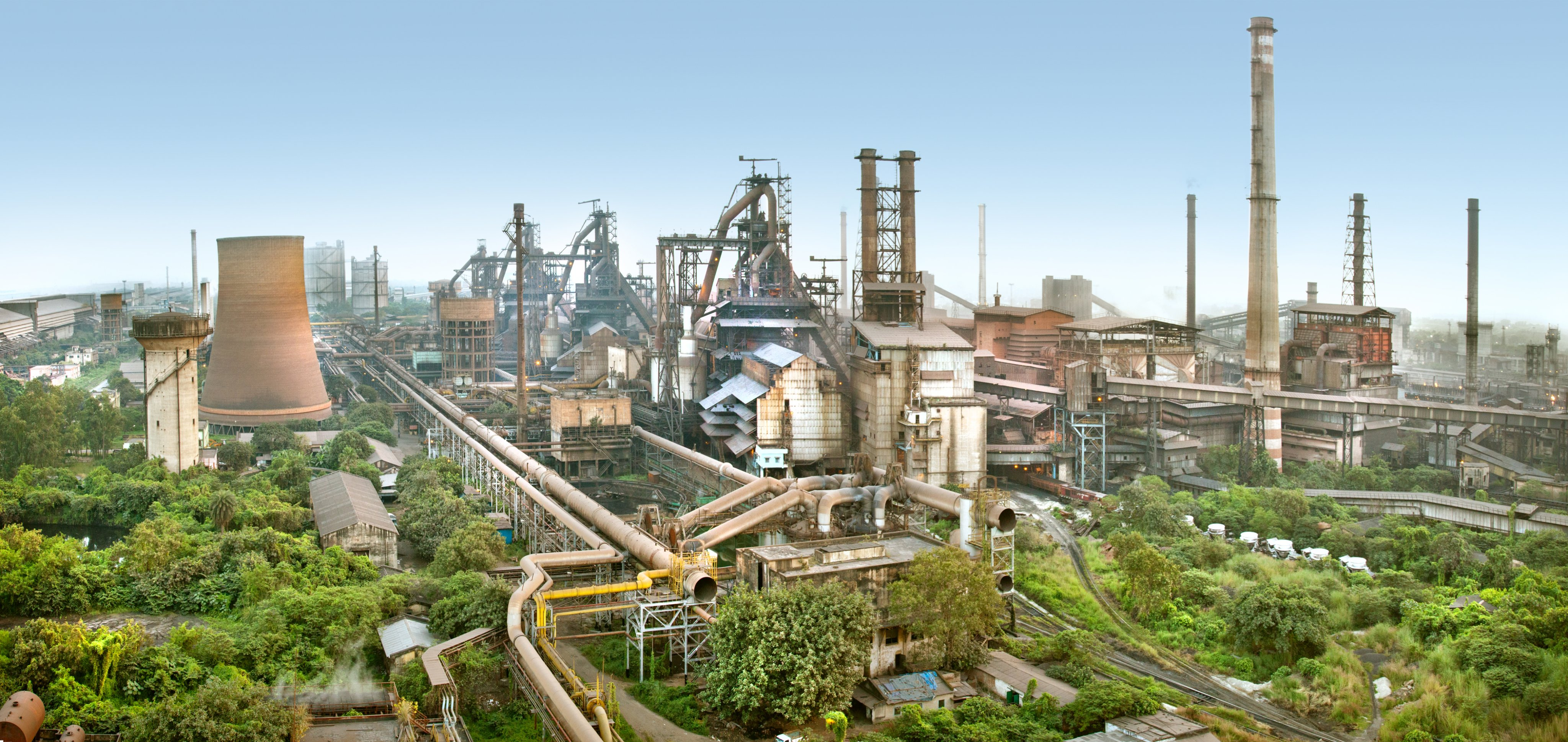
- Industry: Iron and steel
- Founded: 1959
- Headquarters: Durgapur, West Bengal, India
- Key people: B P Singh, Director in Charge, Burnpur & Durgapur Steel Plants
- Products: Merchant products, structural steel, wheels, axles
- Revenue: $9.7 billion (2023)

Durgapur Steel Plant (DSP) is one of the integrated steel plants of Steel Authority of India Limited, located in Durgapur, in the eastern Indian state of West Bengal.

== Overview ==
Durgapur Steel Plant is the largest industrial unit in West Bengal.Established in the late 1950s with assistance from the United Kingdom, DSP commenced operations in 1959.

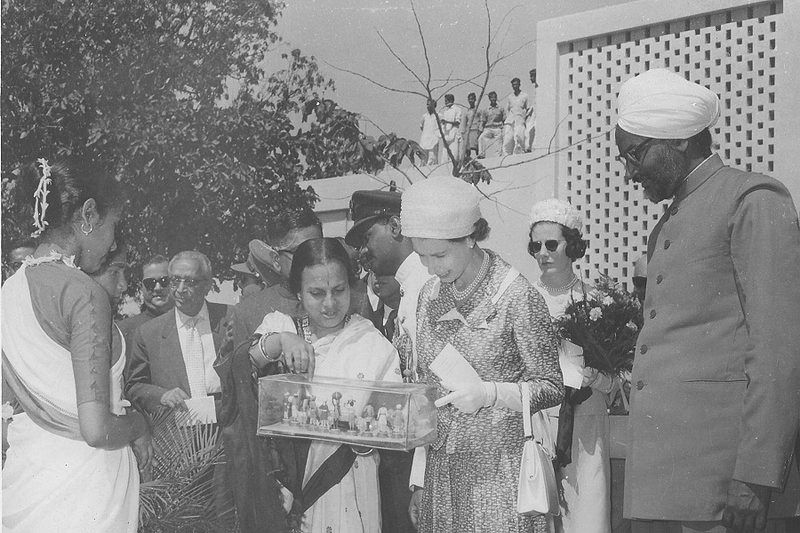
Queen Elizabeth at Durgapur

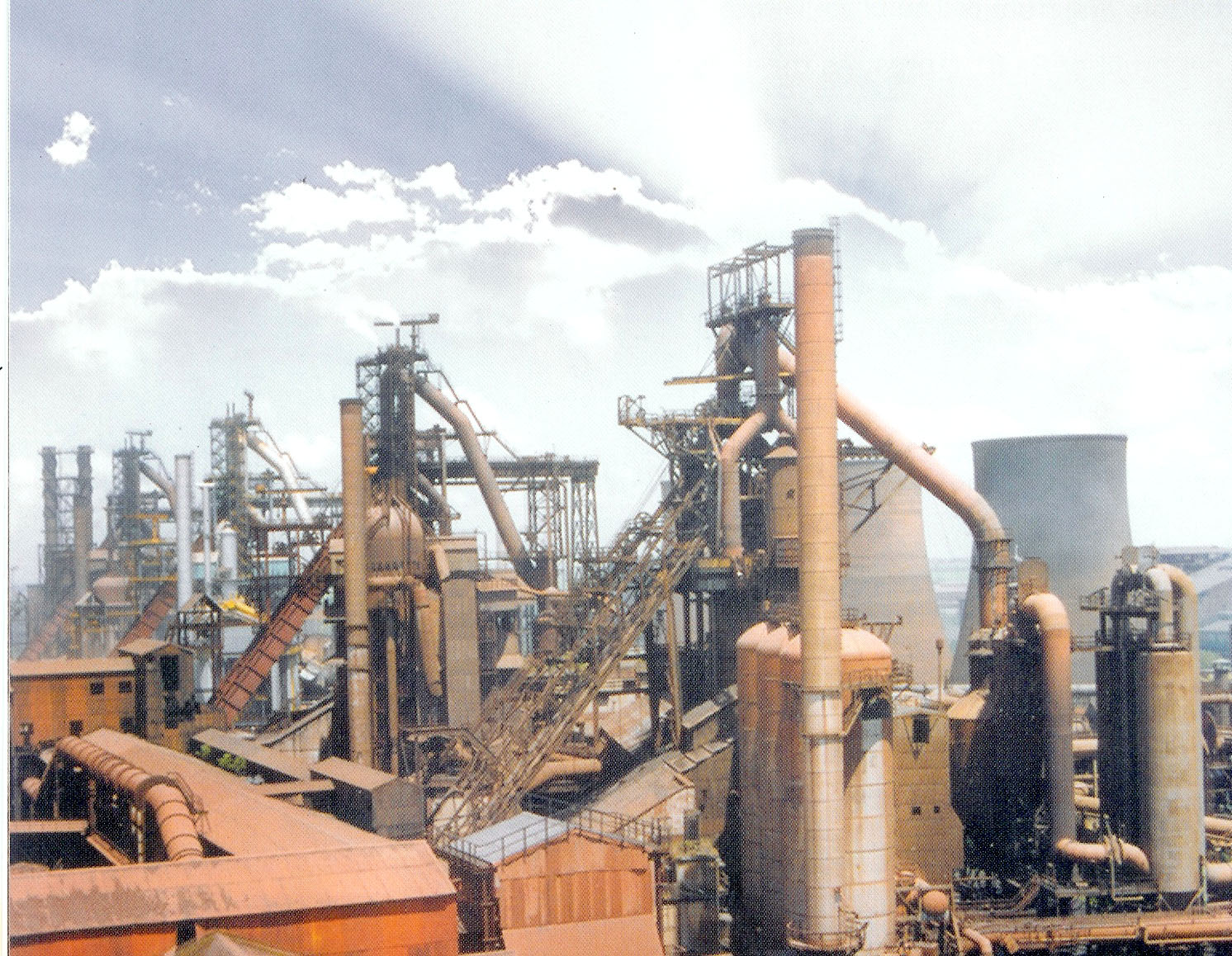
Blast Furnces of Durgapur Steel Plant prior to modernisation

== Location ==
Durgapur Steel Plant is situated about 158 km from Kolkata, its geographical location is defined as 23° 27' North and 88° 29' East. It is situated on the banks of the Damodar River in the Paschim Bardhaman district in the growing industrial city of Durgapur. The Grand Trunk Road and the main Kolkata-Delhi railway line pass through Durgapur.

== Infrastructure and Facilities ==
DSP is a fully integrated steel production setup, encompassing: (1) Raw Material Handling; (2) Ironmaking with advanced blast furnaces;(3) Steelmaking with basic oxygen furnaces and continuous casters; (4) Rolling Mills: Including medium structural mills, wire rod mills, and merchant mills, shaping steel into various forms;(5) Wheel & Axle Plant: Specialized facility for manufacturing forged railway wheels and axles.

== Modernisation and Expansion ==
Durgapur Steel Plant was set up in 1959 for a production of 1 million tonnes of crude steel annually. It was modernised in 1988-89 and its capacity to produce crude steel was raised to 1.8 million tonnes annually.Subsequently DSP produces 2.2 million tonnes of steel after two rounds of modernisation.

Steel Authority of India has decided to further raise its capacity of Durgapur Steel Plant by 3.09 metric tonnes per annum its crude steel capacity by installing some new units (notably a new 3000 cubic metre volume blast furnace, a 2.5 milliontonnes per annum capacity iron ore pelletisation plant, a 0.4 million tonnes per annum capacity bar mill and other plants while upgrading some of the existing units.The plant extension will cost around ₹35,000 crore.

== Product mix tonnes/annum ==
Merchant products 280,000
Structural 500,000
Wheels & axles 58,000
Semis 861,000
Total saleable steel 2,262,000

Forged wheels specifically are made here; in October 2010, DSP licensed technology from Ukrainian manufacturer Interpipe which would allow it to make 955mm monobloc wheels.

== See also ==
- IISCO Steel Plant
