= Education in West Bengal =

Education in West Bengal is provided by both the public sector as well as the private sector. Health Sciences, University of North Bengal and University of Calcutta.

== History ==
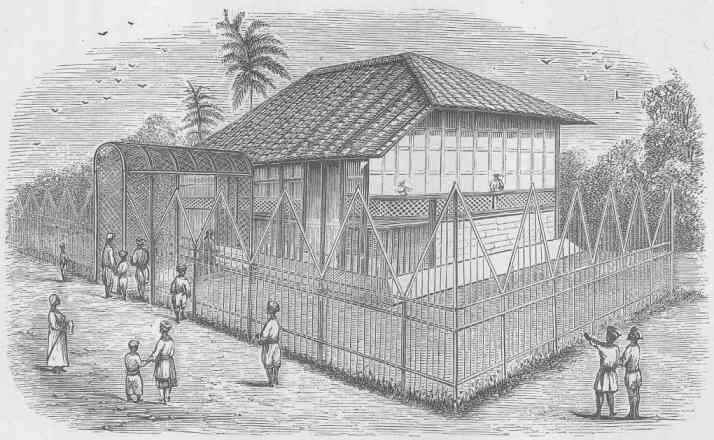
London Mission Bengali Girls' School, Calcutta (LMS, 1869, p.12)

Kolkata has played a pioneering role in the development of the modern education system in India. Western models of education came to India through Kolkata. Many of the first schools and colleges were established by the missionaries and reformists. Sir William Jones established the Asiatic Society in 1784 for promoting oriental studies. People like Ram Mohan Roy, David Hare, Ishwar Chandra Vidyasagar, Sashibhusan Chattopadhyay FRGS FRSA, Maharshi Nagendranath - Bhaduri Mahasaya and William Carey played a leading role in the setting up of modern schools and colleges in the city. The Fort William College was established in 1800. The Hindu College was established in 1817. In 1855, the Hindu College, Calcutta was renamed as the Presidency College.

William Carey established the Serampore College in Serampore City (30 km from Calcutta), 1818. It went on to become India's first modern university in 1827 when it was incorporated by a Royal Charter as a Danish University. Although it had the charter, it was not technically a university in the modern sense of that term. The Sanskrit College was established in 1824. Reverend Alexander Duff of the Church of Scotland established the General Assembly's Institution in 1830 and later the Free Church Institution in 1844, which were later merged to form what is now known as the Scottish Church College, Calcutta. These institutions played a significant role in what came to be known as the Young Bengal Movement and the Bengal Renaissance. La Martiniere Calcutta was established in 1836. John Bethune established a school for Indian girls in 1850 at a time when women's education was frowned upon in the society. The Bethune College for girls was set up by him in 1879.

The oldest medical school in Asia, the Calcutta Medical College was set up in 1835. In 1857, the University of Calcutta was established as the first full-fledged multi-disciplinary university in south Asia. It was modelled on the lines of the University of London. Today it is amongst the largest multidisciplinary universities of India and offers some of the widest number of academic disciplines for study. In 1856 technical and engineering education came with the establishment of a civil engineering college / department. This setup went through various reorganisations to finally become the Bengal Engineering College in 1921. The Jesuit administered St Xavier's College was established in 1860. In 1906, the partition of Bengal led to widespread nationalistic and anti British feelings. This led to the setting up of the National Council of Education, Bengal. This later on became the Jadavpur University in 1955. The nation's first homeopathy college was established in the city in 1880. In 1883 Kadambini Ganguly and Chandramukhi Basu became the first women graduates from the University of Calcutta. In the process, they became the first female graduates of the British Empire. Kadambini went on to become the first female physician trained in the Western system of medicine in South Asia. The Science College was established in 1917. The first blind school came into being in 1925.

After independence, Calcutta continued to be in the forefront of the educational scene. The Government College of Art & Craft was established in 1951. The Rabindra Bharati University was established in 1962. This university offers courses in the fine and performing arts. The Indian Institute of Social Welfare and Business Management was set up in 1953 as the country's first management institute and is also the first in the country to offer an MBA degree of a university. The first, Indian Institute of Technology was set up at Kharagpur about 120 km from Calcutta. In 1960 the Regional Engineering college (presently National Institute of Technology) at Durgapur was set up. It is amongst the top NITs in India and also among the oldest. Indian Institute of Management Calcutta, the first among the Indian Institutes of Management, was set up in 1961 at Joka. It was the first national institute for post-graduate studies and research in management sciences. It was established with the help of the MIT Sloan School of Management and the Ford Foundation.

== Structure ==
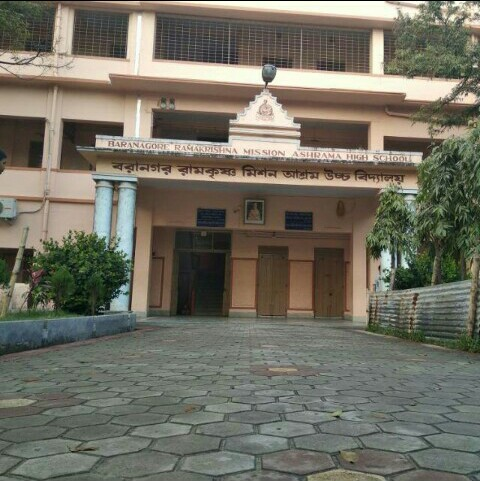
Baranagore Ramakrishna Mission Ashrama High School

West Bengal schools are run by the School Education Department, West Bengal government or by private organisations, including religious institutions. Instruction is mainly in English or Bengali, though Urdu is also used, especially in Central Kolkata. The secondary schools are affiliated with the Council for the Indian School Certificate Examinations (CISCE), the Central Board for Secondary Education (CBSE), the National Institute of Open School (NIOS) or the West Bengal Board of Secondary Education. Under the 10+2+3 plan, after completing secondary school, students typically enroll for 2 years in a junior college, also known as pre-university, or in schools with a higher secondary facility affiliated with the West Bengal Council of Higher Secondary Education or any central board. Students choose from one of three streams, namely liberal arts, commerce or science. Upon completing the required coursework, students may enrol in general or professional degree programs. South Point School, St. Xaviers Collegiate School, Baranagore Ramakrishna Mission Ashrama High School etc. are some of the best schools of West Bengal.

== Major universities ==
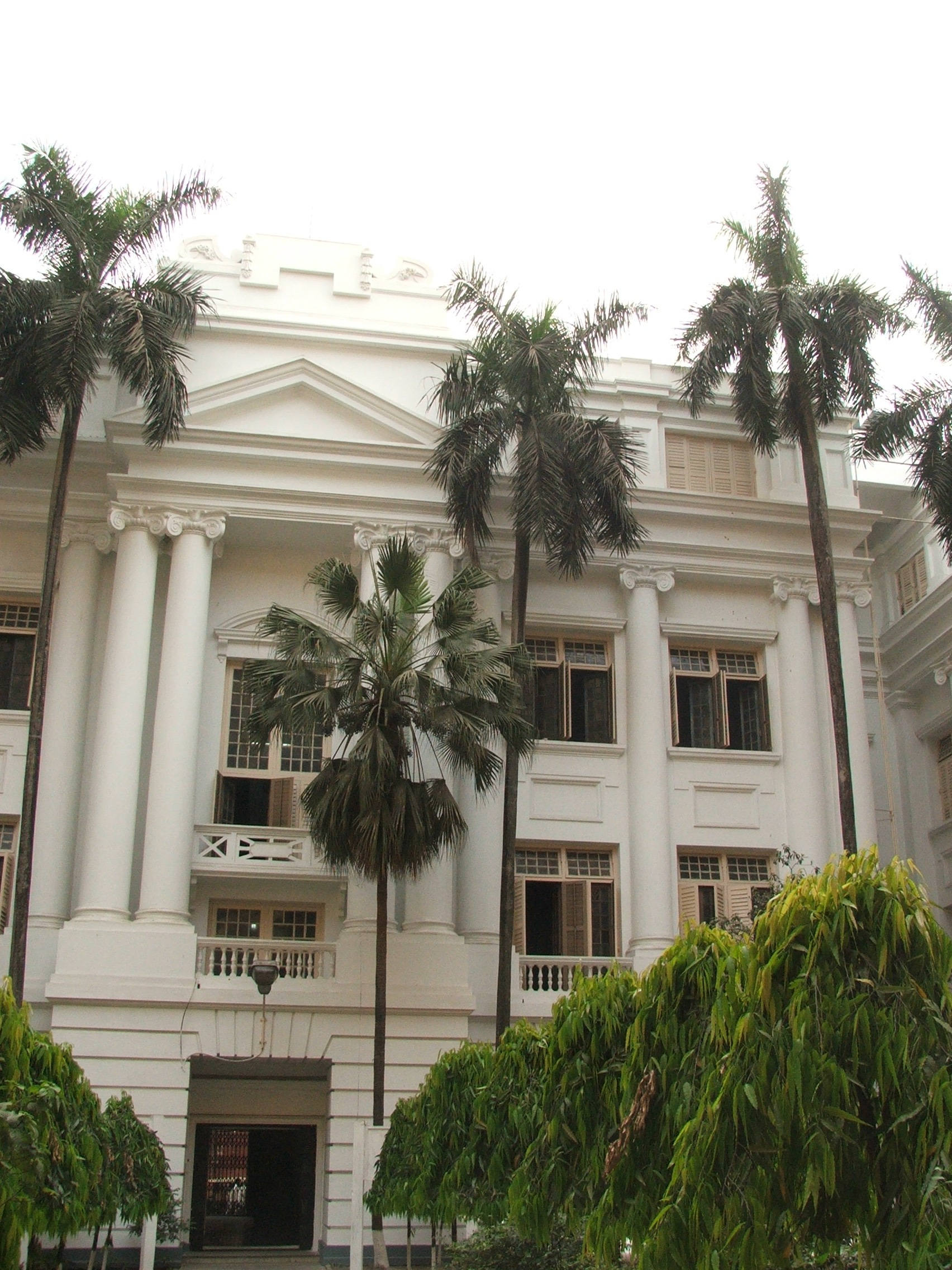
Ashutosh Building of the University of Calcutta at the College Street campus

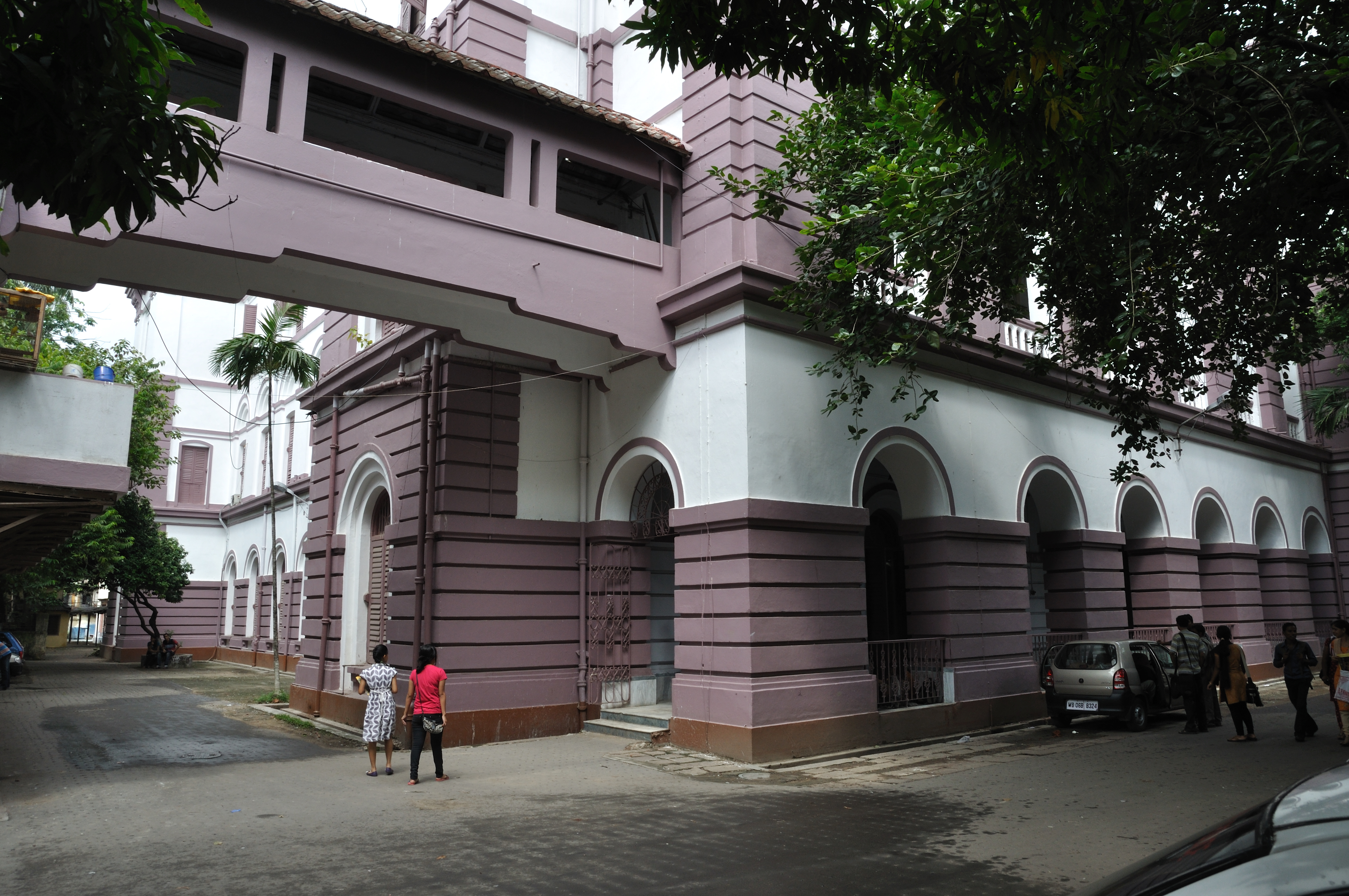
The historic Presidency University at the College Street campus

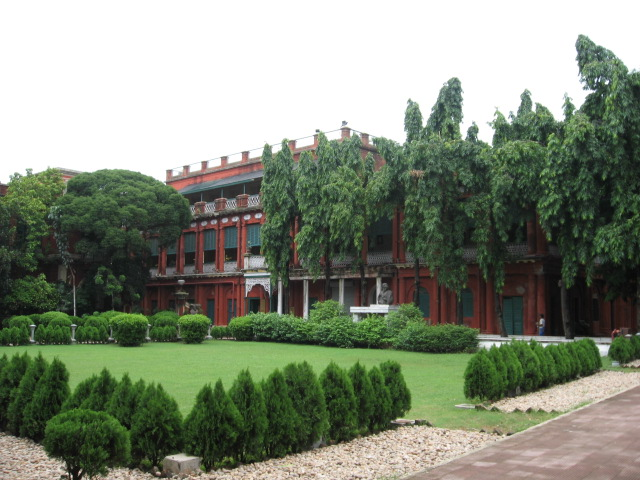
Jorasanko Thakur Bari where Rabindra Bharati University, a state university established in 1962, is located

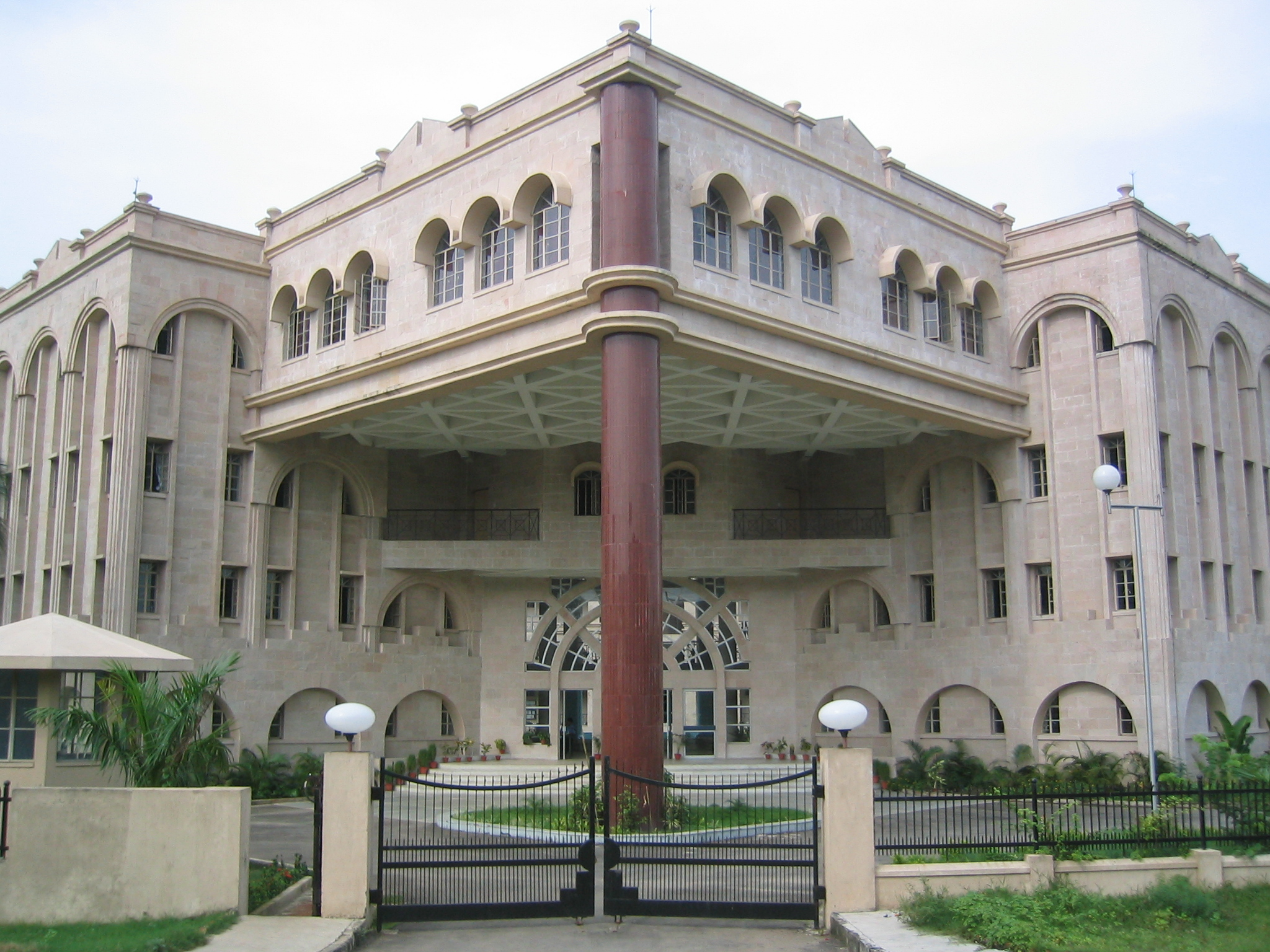
West Bengal National University of Juridical Sciences is a legal education state university established in 2004

In West Bengal there is one central university, twenty seven state universities, eleven private universities and two deemed university. Besides, there are three Regional Centres of IGNOU at Siliguri, Kolkata and Raghunathganj and one Sub - Regional Centre of IGNOU at Darjeeling.

=== State universities ===
University	Location	Type	Established	Specialization	Sources
Aliah University	Kolkata	State	1781	Arts, Sciences, Engineering, Management, Islamic Studies	
Alipurduar University	Alipurduar	State	2020	Arts, Science	
Bankura University	Bankura	State	2014	Arts, Sciences, Engineering, Law	
Scottish church college	Nadia	State	1974	Agriculture, Horticulture and Agricultural Engineering	
Biswa Bangla Biswabidyalay	Bolpur	State	2020	Science, Arts and Commerce	
University of Burdwan	Bardhaman	State	1960	Arts, Sciences, Commerce, Engineering and Law	
University of Calcutta	Kolkata	State	1857	Arts, Sciences, Commerce, Engineering and Law	
Cooch Behar Panchanan Barma University	Cooch Behar	State	2012	Arts, Sciences	
Dakshin Dinajpur University	Balurghat	State	2021	Humanities and Basic Sciences	
Darjeeling Hills University	Darjeeling	State	2021	Humanities and Basic Sciences	
Diamond Harbour Women's University	Diamond Harbour	State	2013	Humanities and Basic Sciences	
University of Gour Banga	Malda	State	2008	Arts, Sciences, and Commerce	
Harichand Guruchand University	Gaighata	State	2021	Arts, Sciences, and Commerce	
Hindi University	Howrah	State	2021	Languages	
University of Kalyani	Kalyani	State	1960	Arts, Sciences, Commerce and Law	
Jadavpur	Kolkata	State; Autonomous	1955	Engineering, Technology, Science, Arts and Commerce	
Kanyashree University	Krishnanagar	State	2020	Arts, Sciences and Commerce	
Kazi Nazrul University	Asansol	State	2012	Arts, Sciences, Commerce, law and Engineering.	
Mahatma Gandhi University, West Bengal	Mahishadal	State	2020	Arts, Sciences and Commerce.	
Maulana Abul Kalam Azad University of Technology	Kolkata	State	2000	Engineering and Management	
Murshidabad University	Berhampore	State	2021	Arts, Sciences and Commerce	
Netaji Subhas Open University	Kolkata	State and distance education	1998	Arts, Sciences, and Commerce	
University of North Bengal	Siliguri	State	1962	Arts, Sciences, Commerce, and Law	
Presidency University	Kolkata	State	1817	Arts and Sciences	
Rabindra Bharati University	Kolkata	State	1962	Arts, Fine Arts, and Performing Arts	
Raiganj University	Raiganj	State	2015	Humanities, Science	
Rani Rashmoni Green University	Tarakeswar	State	2020	Science	
Sadhu Ram Chand Murmu University	Jhargram	State	2021	Science, Arts and Commerce	
Senate of Serampore College (University)	Serampore	State	1818	Theology	
Sidho Kanho Birsha University	Purulia	State	2010	Arts and Sciences	
The Sanskrit College and University	Kolkata	State	2015	Sanskrit, Languages	
Uttar Banga Krishi Vishwavidyalaya	Cooch Behar	State	2001	Agriculture, Horticulture	
Vidyasagar University	Midnapur	State	1981	Arts, Sciences, Commerce and Law	
West Bengal National University of Juridical Sciences	Kolkata	State	1999	Law	
West Bengal State University	Barasat	State	2008	Arts, Sciences, Commerce and Law	
West Bengal University of Animal and Fishery Sciences	Kolkata	State	1995	Veterinary & Animal Sciences	
West Bengal University of Health Sciences	Kolkata	State	2003	Medicine	
West Bengal University of Teachers' Training, Education Planning and Administration	Kolkata	State	2015	Teachers Training, B.Ed. M.Ed	

=== Central University ===
University	Location	Type	Established	Specialization	Sources
Visva-Bharati University	Santiniketan (Bolpur)	Central University	1921	Arts and Sciences	
Aligarh Muslim University: Murshidabad Centre	Jangipur (Murshidabad)	Central University	2010	Arts, Sciences and Management	

=== Centrally Funded Technical Institutes & Other Premier institution Campuses ===
- Ghani Khan Choudhury Institute of Engineering & Technology, Malda
- National Institute of Technical Teachers' Training and Research, Kolkata
- National Power Training Institute Durgapur Campus
- IIFT, Kolkata Campus
- Marine Engineering and Research Institute
- Footwear Design and Development Institute Kolkata Campus

=== Institute of National Importance ===
University	Location	Type	Established	Specialization	Sources
Indian Institute of Management Calcutta	Joka	Autonomous	1961	Social Sciences and Management	
Indian Institute of Science Education and Research, Kolkata	Haringhata	Autonomous	2006	Basic Sciences, Applied Sciences	
Indian Statistical Institute	Baranagar	Autonomous	1959	Basic Sciences, Applied Sciences, Social Sciences	
Indian Institute of Technology Kharagpur	Kharagpur	Autonomous	1951	Science, Management, Engineering & Technology, Law	
Indian Institute of Engineering Science and Technology, Shibpur	Howrah	Autonomous	1856	Sciences, Management, Engineering & Technology	
Indian Institute of Information Technology, Kalyani	Kalyani	Autonomous	2014	Engineering & Technology, Sciences	
National Institute of Technology, Durgapur	Durgapur	Autonomous	1960	Engineering & Technology, Sciences, Management	
National Institute of Pharmaceutical Education and Research, Kolkata	Kolkata	Autonomous	2007	Pharmacy	
All India Institute of Medical Sciences, Kalyani	Kalyani	Autonomous	2019	Medical	

=== Deemed universities ===
University	Location	Type	Established	Specialization	Sources
Indian Association for the Cultivation of Science	Kolkata	Deemed	1876	Basic sciences, applied sciences	
Ramakrishna Mission Vivekananda Educational and Research Institute	Belur Math	Deemed	2005	Agricultural Management, Rural Development, Basic Sciences, Indian Culture and Spirituality	

=== Private universities ===
University	Location	Type	Established	Specialization	Sources
Adamas University	Barasat	Private	2014	Sciences, Management, Humanities, Engineering & Technology	
Amity University, Kolkata	New Town	Global Private	2015	Sciences, Management, Humanities, Engineering & Technology	
Brainware University	Kolkata	Private	2015	Engineering & Technology, Agriculture, Sciences, Management, Law, Pharmacy, Nursing, Humanities, Psychology	
International Management Institute Kolkata	Kolkata	Autonomous Management Institute	2011	Management	
JIS University	Agarpara	Private	2014	Science, Engineering & Technology, Pharmacy, Management, Law	
Neotia University	Sarisha	Private	2015	Sciences, Management, Humanities, Engineering & Technology	
Seacom Skills University	Santiniketan (Bolpur)	Private	2014	Sciences, Engineering & Technology	
Sister Nivedita University	New Town	Private	2017	Science, Engineering & Technology, Management, Social Science & Women Studies	
St. Xavier's University, Kolkata	Kolkata	Private	2017	Management, Commerce, Humanities, Mass Communication	
Swami Vivekananda University, Barrackpore	Barrackpore	Private	2020	Science, Management, Agriculture, Engineering & Technology	
Techno India University	Kolkata	Private	2012	Sciences, Management, Engineering & Technology	
University of Engineering & Management (UEM), Kolkata	New Town	Private	2015	Engineering, Technology & Management	

== Research Institutes ==
Research Institutes of West Bengal
Institute	Location	Established	Specialization	Sources
Saha Institute of Nuclear Physics	Kolkata	1950	Science	
S.N. Bose National Centre for Basic Sciences	Kolkata	1986	Science	
Bose Institute	Kolkata	1917	Science	
Variable Energy Cyclotron Centre	Kolkata	1977	Science	
Central Glass and Ceramic Research Institute	Kolkata	1950	Science and Technology	
Indian Institute of Chemical Biology	Kolkata	1935	Science	
Central Mechanical Engineering Research Institute	Durgapur	1958	Science and Technology	
Central Inland Fisheries Research Institute	Kolkata	1959	Science	
National Institute of Biomedical Genomics	Kalyani	2010	Science	
Central Research Institute for Jute and Allied Fibers	Kolkata	1953	Science and Technology	
Indian Centre for Space Physics	Kolkata	1999	Science	
National Institute of Research on Jute and Allied Fibre Technology	Kolkata	1938	Science and Technology	

== Medical Colleges ==
Name	Established	City	University	Type	Degrees Awarded	Comments	Ref.
Bankura Sammilani Medical College	1956	Bankura	WBUHS	State Funded			
Barasat Government Medical College and Hospital	2022	Barasat	WBUHS	State Funded			
Burdwan Medical College	1969	Purba Bardhaman	WBUHS	State Funded			
Calcutta National Medical College	1948	Kolkata	WBUHS	State Funded			
College Of Medicine & JNM Hospital	2009	Kalyani	University Campus	State Funded			
College of Medicine & Sagore Dutta Hospital	2010	Kolkata	WBUHS	State Funded			
Coochbehar Government Medical College and Hospital	2019	Coochbehar	WBUHS	State Funded			
Deben Mahata Government Medical College and Hospital	2020	Purulia	WBUHS	State Funded			
ESIC Medical College, Kolkata	2013	Joka	WBUHS	Central Funded			
Gouri Devi Institute of Medical Sciences and Hospital	2016	Durgapur	WBUHS	Private			
ICARE Institute of Medical Sciences and Research	2011	Haldia	WBUHS	Private			
IPGMER and SSKM Hospital	1707	Kolkata	WBUHS	State Funded			
IQ City Medical College	2016	Durgapur	WBUHS	Private			
Jalpaiguri Government Medical College and Hospital	2022	Jalpaiguri	WBUHS	State Funded			
JIS Institute of Medical Science and Research	2023	Santragachi	WBUHS	Private			
JMN Medical College	2016	Chakdah	WBUHS	Private			
Jagannath Gupta Institute of Medical Sciences and Hospital	2016	Kolkata	WBUHS	Private			
Jhargram Government Medical College and Hospital	2022	Jhargram	WBUHS	State Funded			
KPC Medical College and Hospital	2006	Kolkata	WBUHS	Private			
Malda Medical College and Hospital	2011	Malda	WBUHS	State Funded			
Medical College and Hospital, Kolkata	1835	Kolkata	WBUHS	State Funded			
Midnapore Medical College and Hospital	2004	Midnapore	WBUHS	State Funded			
Murshidabad Medical College	2012	Berhampore	WBUHS	State Funded			
Nil Ratan Sarkar Medical College and Hospital	1873	Kolkata	WBUHS	State Funded			
North Bengal Medical College	1968	Siliguri	WBUHS	State Funded			
Diamond Harbour Government Medical College and Hospital	2019	Diamond Harbour	WBUHS	State Funded			
Prafulla Chandra Sen Government Medical College and Hospital	2022	Arambagh	WBUHS	State Funded			
Raiganj Government Medical College and Hospital	2019	Raiganj	WBUHS	State Funded			
Rampurhat Government Medical College and Hospital	2019	Birbhum	WBUHS	State Funded			
Shri Ramkrishna Institute of Medical Sciences and Sanaka Hospital	2015	Durgapur	WBUHS	Private			
R. G. Kar Medical College and Hospital	1886	Kolkata	WBUHS	State Funded			
Sarat Chandra Chattopadhyay Government Medical College and Hospital	2022	Uluberia	WBUHS	State Funded			
Tamralipto Government Medical College and Hospital	2022	Tamluk	WBUHS	State Funded			
Dr B C Roy Institute of Medical Sciences & Research	2024	Kharagpur	WBUHS	State Funded			

== Allied Health Sciences Institutes ==
State Medical Faculty of West Bengal

== See also ==
- Universities and colleges of West Bengal
- List of schools in West Bengal
