= Santiniketan Medical College =

Medical college in West Bengal

- Type: PPP Medical College & Hospital
- Established: 2021; 5 years ago
- Affiliations: WBUHS; NMC
- Chairman: Malay Pit
- Principal: Dr. Prabir Sengupta
- Students: Totals: MBBS - 150
- Location: Gobindapur, Bolpur, Birbhum district, West Bengal, 731204, India
- Campus: 25 acres (10 ha)
- Language: English & Bengali
- Website: www.smcbangla.com

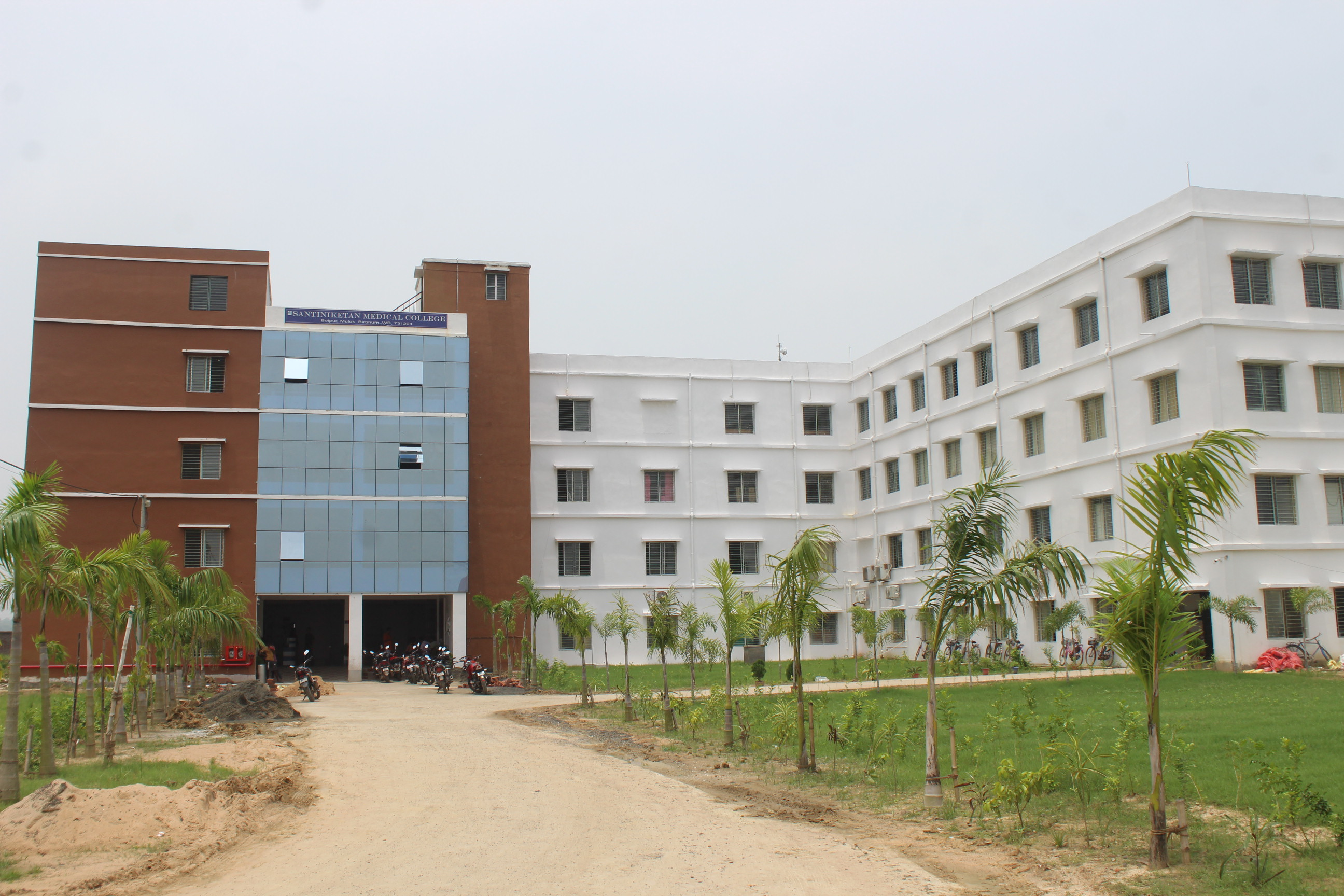

Santiniketan Medical College (SMC), established in 2021, is a private/Public-Private partnership (PPP Model) medical college located in Santiniketan, Bolpur, West Bengal, India. It offers the Bachelor of Medicine and Surgery (MBBS) degree course. The college is recognized by the National Medical Commission and affiliated with the West Bengal University of Health Sciences. The hospital associated with this college is the Bolpur Subdivisional Hospital. SMC is also the India's 1st PPP medical College under National Medical Commission Act.
