= Shri Ramkrishna Institute of Medical Sciences and Sanaka Hospital =

Medical School and Hospital in Durgapur, West Bengal

Shri Ramkrishna Institute of Medical Sciences and Sanaka Hospitals
- Motto: Skill To Heal, Spirit To Care
- Recognition: National Medical Commission
- Type: Private Medical College & Hospital
- Established: 2019; 7 years ago
- Academic affiliations: West Bengal University of Health Sciences
- Chairman: Tapan Kumar Pobi
- Principal: Col. (Dr.) Debajyoti Bhattacharyya
- Students: MBBS - 250
- Location: Kanksa, Durgapur, West Bengal, 713212, India; 23°34′25″N 87°24′16″E
- Website: srims.setgoi.ac.in

Shri Ramkrishna Institute of Medical Sciences and Sanaka Hospital is a private (150 seats) medical college located in Durgapur, West Bengal. It was established in 2019.

== About the college ==
The institute offers undergraduate seats for MBBS (150 seats) which are recognised by the National Medical Commission. The medical college also has a 385-bedded functional hospital which would be upgraded to 750 bedded within 5 years, named Sanaka Hospital, with facilities consisting of minor and major OT, PICU, NICU, ICCU and ICU. It has got NMC permission to start its MBBS course in 2019. This medical college has its own nursing and paramedical college also.

In 2020, during the coronavirus (COVID-19) outbreak, Sanaka hospital was converted into a COVID hospital by the Government of West Bengal and the nodal centre for 5 districts namely Paschim Bardhaman, Purba Bardhaman, Purulia, Bankura. It has treated many COVID patients and played a pivotal role in suppression of the pandemic in South Bengal. AIIMS, Bhubaneswar has recommended ICMR for permitting this college to start COVID-19 testing and it has got NABH accreditation and ICMR permission for covid testing in its own laboratory. It already dedicated 400 bed to government patients for free treatment and has 76 CCU, dedicated to COVID patients.

Outpatient department (OPD) doctor consultation fees in this medical college hospital is ₹50. It has a 250-seat examination hall in its college building. It also has dialysis facility inside the seven storey hospital. It is locally known as Sanaka Medical College.

It is one of the 23 medical colleges teaching MBBS in West Bengal. Its first MBBS batch will graduate in 2025.

Department include:

- Anatomy
- Physiology
- Biochemistry
- Pathology
- Microbiology
- Pharmacology
- Community Medicine
- General Medicine
- General Surgery
- Orthopaedic
- ENT
- Ophthalmology
- Radiology

It contains one super speciality department:

- Nephrology

== See also ==
- Healthcare in India
- List of hospitals in India
- Bengal Homoeopathic Medical College and Hospital
