= ICARE Institute of Medical Sciences and Research =

Indian medical college

ICARE Institute of Medical Sciences & Research
- Type: Private Medical College & Hospital
- Established: 2011; 15 years ago
- Affiliations: WBUHS; NMC
- Chairman: Lakshman Chandra Seth
- Principal: Dr. Shyamal Chandra Sarkar
- Students: Totals: MBBS - 250; MD/MS- 50
- Location: Banbishnupur, Balughata, Haldia, West Bengal, West Bengal, 721645, India; 22°3′50.89″N 88°2′9.44″E
- Website: icaremedicalcollege.in

ICARE Institute of Medical Sciences & Research, established in 2011, is a private medical college located in Haldia, West Bengal. This college offers the Bachelor of Medicine and Surgery (MBBS) courses and postgraduate MD courses in Pathology, Pharmacology, Microbiology, Biochemistry. This college is affiliated with the West Bengal University of Health Sciences and recognized by the National Medical Commission. It is established by a society named Indian Centre for Advancement of Research and Education (ICARE). It is connected to a 500-bed multispeciality facility named the Bidhan Chandra Roy Hospital.

== Departments ==
The departments in ICARE Institute of Medical Sciences and Research are as follows:

- Department of Anasthesiology
- Department of Anatomy
- Department of Biochemistry
- Department of Community Medicine
- Department of Dentistry
- Department of Dermatology and V&L
- Department of ENT(Ear, Nose and Throat)
- Department of General Medicine
- Department of General Surgery
- Department of Obstetrics & Gynaecology
- Department of Ophthalmology
- Department of Orthopaedics
- Department of Paediatrics
- Department of Radiology
- Department of Microbiology
- Department of Pathology
- Department of Pharmacology
- Department of Physiology
- Department of Psychiatry
- Department of Forensic Medicine

== See also ==
- Guru Nanak Institute of Dental Sciences and Research
- Dr B C Roy Institute of Medical Sciences & Research
