= Diamond Harbour Government Medical College and Hospital =

Government Medical College in West Bengal, India

- Motto: सर्वे सन्तु निरामयाः(Sarve santu nirāmayāḥ) (Sanskrit)
- Motto in English: Let all be healthy
- Recognition: NMC; INC
- Type: Public Medical College and Hospital
- Established: 2019; 7 years ago
- Academic affiliations: West Bengal University of Health Sciences
- Principal: Dr. Md. Sadique Mallick (acting)
- Location: Harindanga, New Town, Diamond Harbour, South 24 Parganas, West Bengal, India; 22.2001°N 88.1928°E
- Campus: Semi-urban
- Website: dhgmc.edu.in

Diamond Harbour Government Medical College and Hospital is a full-fledged tertiary referral Government Medical college. The journey of this Medical College and Hospital had started in December, 1974 under the name of Diamond Harbour Sub-divisional Hospital. Later it had been converted to Diamond Harbour District Hospital in April 2012 with 300 beds, and subsequently it was renamed as Diamond Harbour Government Medical College.

The college imparts the degree Bachelor of Medicine and Surgery (MBBS) and Postgraduate courses. Nursing and para-medical courses are also offered. The college is affiliated to West Bengal University of Health Sciences and is recognized by the National Medical Commission. The Diamond Harbour District Hospital and Super Speciality hospital are associated with the medical college. The selection to the college is done strictly on the basis of merit through National Eligibility and Entrance Test. Yearly undergraduate student intake is 150 as of 2022.The college had started its MBBS course with an intake of 100 seats.

== Courses ==
Diamond Harbour Government Medical College, West Bengal undertakes education and training of students for MBBS course with an intake of 100 students annually via NEET-UG. It also offers Post-graduate courses recognized by the NBEMS & NMC. The post-graduate students in various courses of medicine and surgery get admitted to GMC through all India post-graduate medical entrance examinations i.e. NEET-PG held once every year in January.

== See also ==
- List of hospitals in India
