= Raiganj Government Medical College and Hospital =

Medical college in West Bengal

- Motto: Commitment to the Community
- Recognition: NMC; INC
- Type: Public Medical College & Hospital
- Established: 2018; 8 years ago
- Academic affiliations: West Bengal University of Health Sciences
- Principal: Dr. Sanjoy Kumar Mallick
- Students: Totals: MBBS - 150
- Location: Dr. Bidhan Chandra Roy Sarani, Raiganj, Uttar Dinajpur, West Bengal, 733134, India; 25.6099°N 88.1325°E
- Website: www.raiganjgmch.org

Raiganj Government Medical College and Hospital (RGMC&H) is a tertiary referral Government Medical college. It was established in the year 2018. The college imparts the degree Bachelor of Medicine and Surgery (MBBS). The college is affiliated to West Bengal University of Health Sciences and is recognized by the National Medical Commission. The hospital associated with the college is one of the largest hospitals in the Uttar Dinajpur district. The selection to the college is done on the basis of merit through NEET (UG).

Yearly undergraduate student intake is 100 from the year 2019. There are two different campuses, the main campus is at Dr. B. C. Roy Sarani (District Hospital and Super Speciality Hospital campus-makeshift campus for medical college) and another campus for academic activities is under construction near bank of Kulik river at Abdulghata, about 5 km away from the main hospital campus.

== Courses ==
Raiganj Government Medical College, West Bengal undertakes education and training of students MBBS courses.

== See also ==
- List of hospitals in India
- Healthcare in India
- Malda Medical College and Hospital
