= Jagannath Gupta Institute of Medical Sciences and Hospital =

Medical college in Budge Budge, West Bengal, India

- Type: Private Medical College & Hospital
- Established: 2016; 10 years ago
- Affiliations: WBUHS, NMC
- Chairman: K. K. Gupta
- Principal: Dr. Pit Baran Chakraborty
- Students: Totals: MBBS - 250
- Location: KP Mondal Road, Buita, Nishchintapur, Budge Budge, Kolkata, West Bengal, 700137; 22.4533875°N 88.1705799°E
- Website: http://jimsh.org/

Jagannath Gupta Institute of Medical Sciences and Hospital is a medical college established in 2016 located in Budge Budge, West Bengal. The institute offers undergraduate seats for MBBS (250 seats) which are recognised by the National Medical Commission and is a recognised MBBS college of West Bengal which serves people of Budge Budge for COVID-19 relief. The college provides various Medical courses. This medical college is part of the multi-service hospital in Budge Budge.

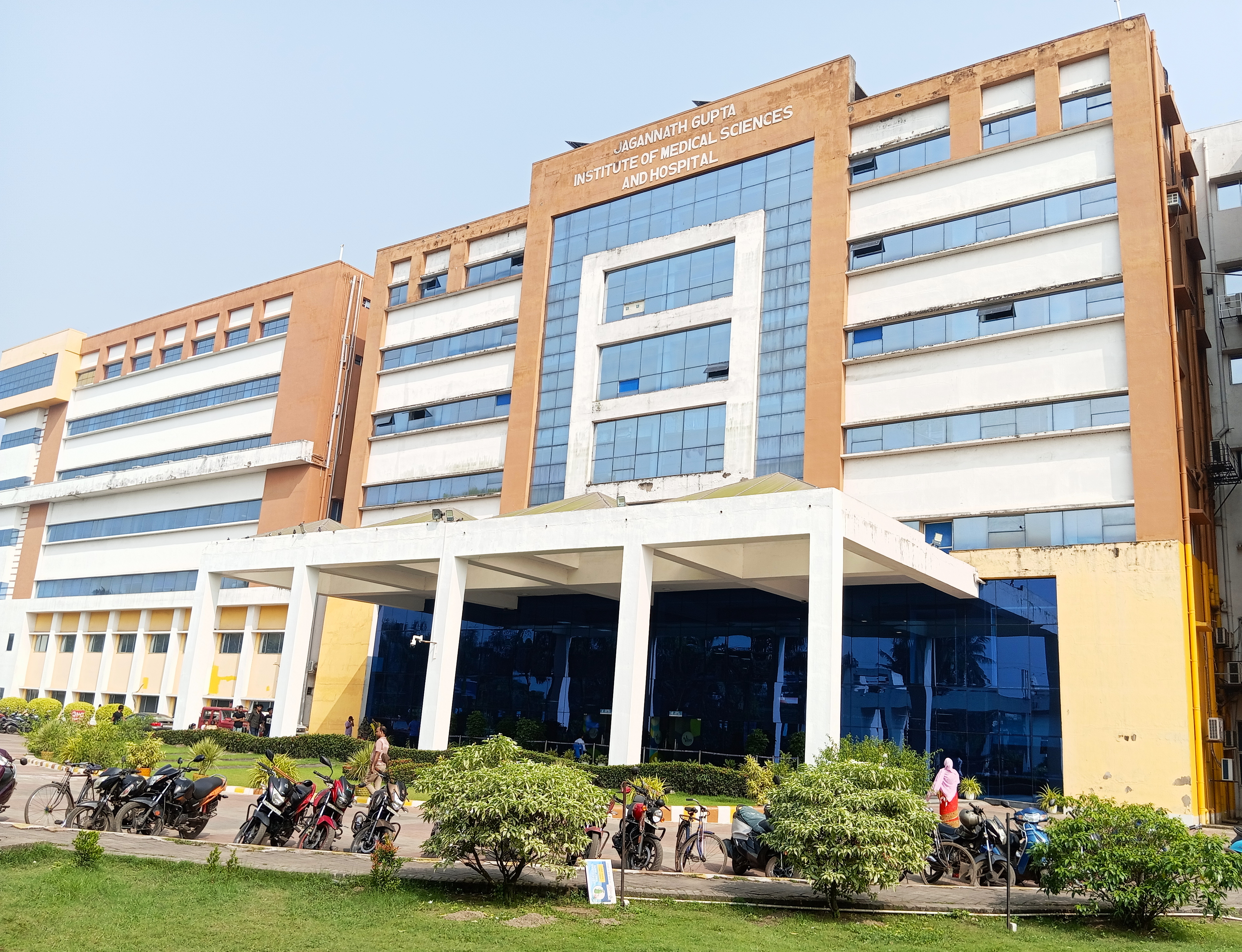
Jagannath Gupta Institute of Medical Sciences and Hospital

The focus of the medical college is to develop skilled healthcare professionals through structured academic programmes, hands-on clinical exposure, and continuous assessment in line with National Medical Commission (NMC) standards.

The institute offers MBBS, GNM, B.Sc Nursing, and paramedical courses approved by the respective regulatory councils.

On 12 April 2025, the Jagannath Gupta Institute of Medical Sciences and Hospital (JIMSH) opened a new 1,200-bed super-speciality branch in Sodepur in 24-Parganas(N), expanding its healthcare network in eastern India. Equipped with advanced technologies, the facility offers multi-disciplinary care in cardiology, neurology, oncology, and nephrology, and is the second hospital under the JIMSH network after its Budge Budge institute.

Recent Expansion of Seats

For the academic year 2025–26, JIMSH has received a Letter of Permission from the National Medical Commission for 250 MBBS seats. In addition, the West Bengal Nursing Council and Indian Nursing Council have approved 100 seats each for GNM and B.Sc Nursing programmes, while the State Medical Faculty of West Bengal has sanctioned 130 seats for paramedical courses. This expansion reflects the institute’s growing capacity and commitment to increasing access to medical and allied health education in eastern India.

== See also ==
- List of hospitals in India
