= Malati Murmu =

Malati Murmu is an Indian social worker and educator from Jiling Sereng, a remote tribal village in Purulia, West Bengal. She is known for her efforts in educating children of the village with low adult literacy and minimal availability of formal education. Notably, she started Maltibala School, a mudroom structure with two classrooms, where she teaches local students basic lessons in English, Math, and Science.

== Biography ==
Malati came to Jiling Sereng in 2019 after her marriage to Banka Murmu. While the village had a primary school, Malati felt that adult literacy was limited and quality of primary education was poor. She decided to start teaching kids at her own house. She efforts were slowly recognised as recognition among villagers grew and enrolment increased to over 45 students. Eventually, they helped her build a thatched hut with two classrooms and a blackboard each.

== Personal life ==
Malati has two children.

== See also ==
- Literacy in India
- Education in West Bengal
