= Gouri Devi Institute of Medical Sciences and Hospital =

Medical School and Hospital in Durgapur, West Bengal

- Type: Private Medical College & Hospital
- Established: 2016; 10 years ago
- Affiliations: WBUHS, NMC
- President: R. N. Majumdar
- Dean: Dr. Kripasindhu Chatterjee
- Students: Totals: MBBS - 150
- Location: Rajbandh, Durgapur, West Bengal, 713212; 23°28′37″N 87°24′04″E
- Website: gimsh.in

Gouri Devi Institute of Medical Sciences and Hospital, established in 2016, is a private medical college, located in Durgapur, India. Having rank 1 among all private medical colleges of West Bengal. This college offers the Bachelor of Medicine and Surgery (MBBS) courses and MD & MS courses. GIMSH has both state government quota seats (1/3) & private management quota seats (2/3).This college is affiliated with the West Bengal University of Health Sciences and recognized by the National Medical Commission.

== See also ==
- List of hospitals in India
