= Burdwan Medical College =

Medical college in West Bengal, India

Burdwan Medical College and Hospital
- Other name: BMC
- Former names: Frazer Hospital (1910) and Ronaldshay Medical School
- Motto: Latin: Salutem et Educationem
- Motto in English: Health and Education
- Recognition: NMC; INC
- Type: Public Medical College & Hospital
- Established: 9 November 1910; 115 years ago (as Frazer Hospital); 1969; 57 years ago (as Burdwan Medical College and Hospital)
- Founder: Nani Bhattacharya
- Academic affiliations: West Bengal University of Health Sciences
- Budget: ₹650 crore (US$68 million) (2023-24)
- Principal: Dr. Sabyasachi Das
- Faculty: 761
- Total staff: 3000+
- Undergraduates: 200/year seat intake MBBS Allied Health Science Courses : DMLT: 35, DRD : 12, DRT: 9, D.OPT: 6, DCLT: 16, DCCT: 20
- Postgraduates: 143/year seat intake MD/MS
- Doctoral students: 6/year seat intake DM/MCh 6/year seat intake Diploma
- Location: Baburbag, Rajbati, Purba Bardhaman, West Bengal, 713104, India; 23°14′54.18″N 87°51′10.07″E
- Campus: Urban, 253 acres (102 ha)
- Colours: Sky blue and gold
- Website: www.bmcgov.com
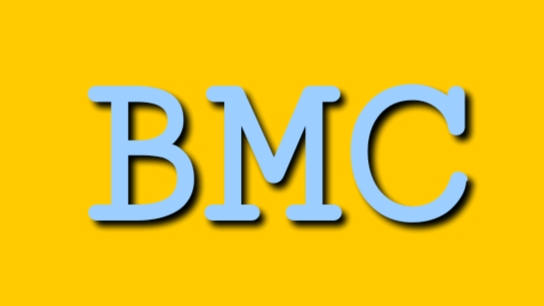

Burdwan Medical College is a public hospital and medical college located in the town of Burdwan, Purba Bardhaman, West Bengal. On 13 July 1907, the decision was made to build a hospital in Burdwan. Burdwan Medical College was established on 9 November 1910 by the then Governor of Bengal and was undertaken by the University of Burdwan in 1969 as Burdwan University Medical College. Later, it was and rechristened as Burdwan Medical College on 4 August 1976. The campus is spread over approximately 253 acres (102 ha).

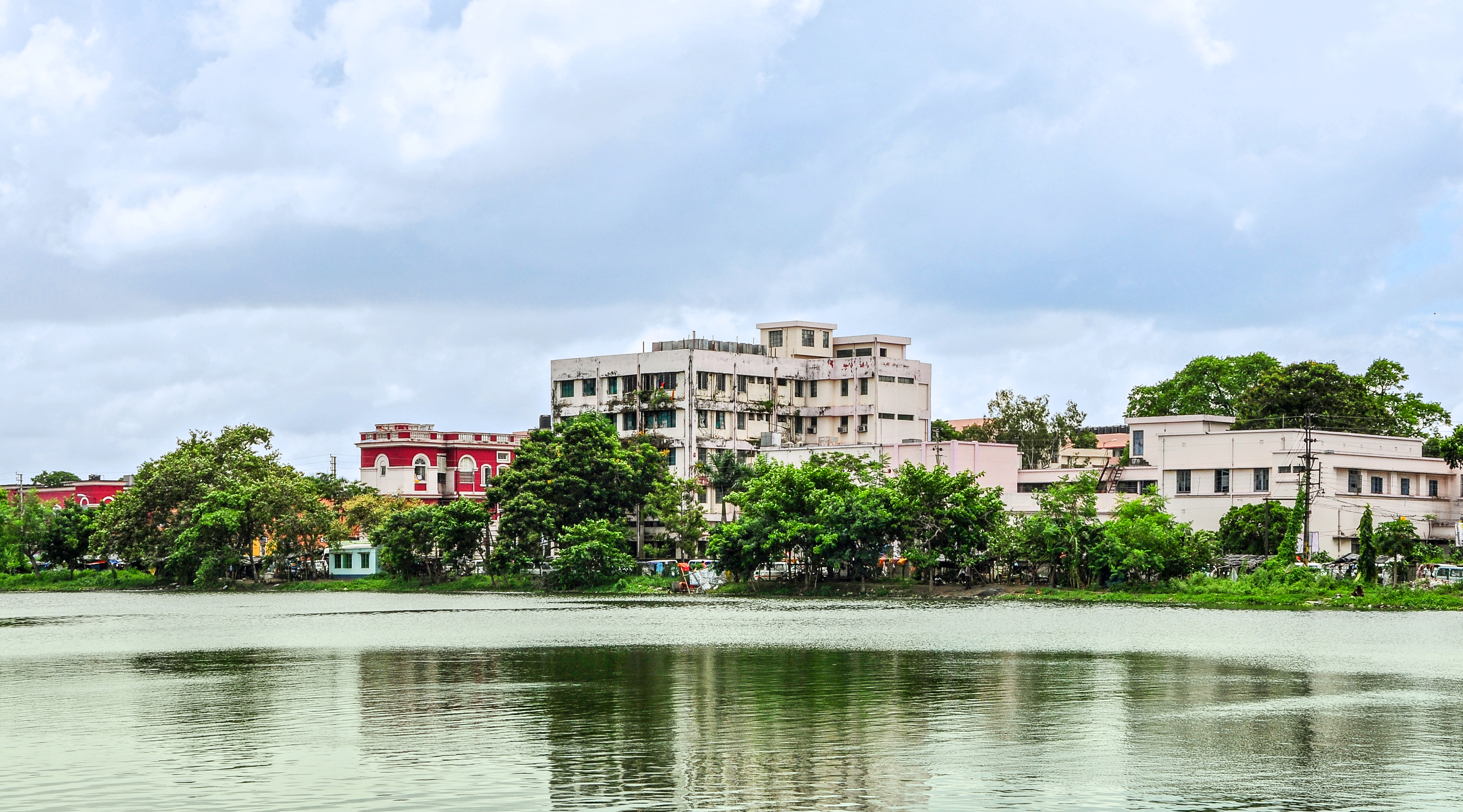
Burdwan Medical College Hospital campus view from Shyam Sayer

It is one of the oldest medical college to teach Western medicine in Asia and the first institute to teach in English language in Burdwan. Bijay Chand Hospital (currently as Burdwan Medical College & Hospital) associated with the college is the largest hospital in Purba Bardhaman.

== History ==
On 13 July 1907, the decision was made to build a hospital in Burdwan. On 9 November 1910, the Frazer Hospital was inaugurated with 127 indoor beds. In 1921, this hospital was converted into a medical school and named Ronaldshay Medical School. Later, the proposal of renaming the medical college was again put forward, and the then Chief Minister of West Bengal, Dr. Bidhan Chandra Roy, agreed to the proposal.

Finally, in 1969, this college was renamed as Burdwan University Medical College and was affiliated to University of Burdwan. The then honorable health minister of West Bengal, Nani Bhattacharya, laid the foundation stone of this new college. This college actually started its journey from a primary school building. The first batch of this college suffered tremendously because of the inadequate infrastructure and shifted to different medical colleges in Kolkata. The second batch of this college, enrolled in 1970, remained at Burdwan and completed their MBBS. However, the second batch took almost eight years to complete their degree. So, the official first batch of students, unofficially the second batch, came out as doctors only in 1978. Later it was taken over by the Government of West Bengal on 4 August 1976, and renamed as Burdwan Medical College. But the College remained as the sole Medical College under the academic jurisdiction of Burdwan University until it was taken up by the West Bengal University of Health Sciences in 2003.

== Courses and admission ==
Burdwan Medical College and Hospital undertakes the education and training of students in MBBS & postgraduate courses. The yearly undergraduate student intake is 200 from the year 2019. Presently, other than medical undergraduates, the institution is also the knowledge hub for nearly 186 post-graduates and 3 super-specialties per batch.

This college is affiliated to West Bengal University of Health Sciences and is recognised by the National Medical Commission. The selection to the college is done on the basis of merit through National Eligibility and Entrance Test (NEET-UG).

== See also ==
- List of hospitals in India
