= Bankura Sammilani Medical College and Hospital =

Public Medical College and Tertiary Teaching Hospital in Gobindanagar, Bankura city

- Former name: Bankura Sammilani Medical School
- Motto: जीव सेवाही शिव सेवा (Jīva sevahī śiva sevā)
- Motto in English: Service to mankind is service to God
- Recognition: NMC; INC
- Type: Public medical college and hospital
- Established: 1922; 104 years ago (as Bankura Sammilani Medical School); 1956; 70 years ago (as Bankura Sammilani Medical College)
- Academic affiliations: West Bengal University of Health Sciences
- Principal: Dr. Panchanan Kundu
- Undergraduates: 200
- Postgraduates: 89 (M.D./M.S.)
- Location: Bankura, West Bengal, 722102, India; 23.2341044°N 87.0348649°E
- Campus: Urban
- Website: bsmedicalcollege.org.in
- Location within West Bengal Location within India

Bankura Sammilani Medical College and Hospital (BSMC&H) is a public medical college and hospital in Bankura, West Bengal, India. It was established by Bankura Sammilani Trust in 1956, under the University of Calcutta.

== History ==
The root for the establishment of this medical college was the formation of Bankura Sammilani Medical School by Bankura Sammilani (Note: presided over by Digambar Chatterjee), in 1922. The medical college in its current form was established in 1956 by Bankura Sammilani Trust as a part of Swaraj movement against the British rule. The college was taken over by the Government of West Bengal in 1961 with an initial student strength of 25, recognised by the Medical Council of India (now National Medical Commission). It also officially recognized its postgraduate degree courses in General Medicine, General Surgery, Pediatrics and Gynecology & Obstetrics since 2009 and in Pathology and Preventive and Social medicine since 2010. More PG seats in Anatomy, Physiology, Biochemistry, Pharmacology, Microbiology, Dermatology, Radio-diagnosis, General Surgery (additional seats), G&O (additional seats), Paediatrics, & Anesthesia were also permitted by the MCI (now NMC) in the year 2013. Now the total UG seats and PG seats at B.S. Medical College are 200 and 78 respectively in each year.

== Location ==
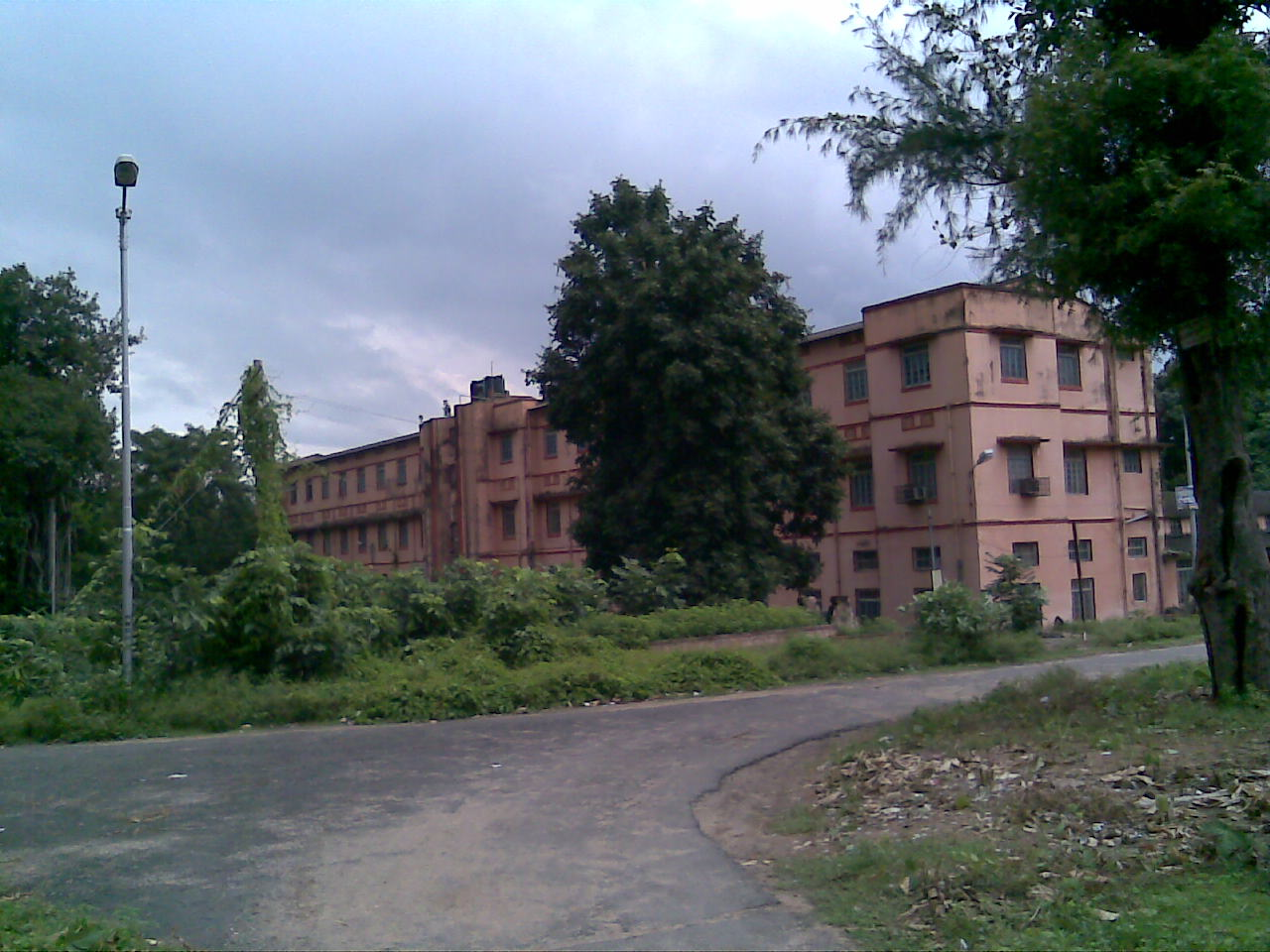
Bankura Sammilani Medical College

This Government institution is located in Bankura District of West Bengal. It has two big campuses, spreading from Lokepur to Gobindanagar. The administrative building, the Pre-clinical departments (First Prof M.B.B.S.), two lecture theaters of 180 capacity each (with e-class room facility) and the OPD/ Indoor facilities of Ophthalmology, Cardiology, Neurology and Dialysis Units are located at Super speciality building campus. The main campus of the hospital, the Para-clinical and Clinical departments, three lecture theaters with audiovisual aids and e-class room facility (2x 180 capacity and 1x350 capacity) are situated at Gobindanagar campus. Seven Hostels for students and residents and staff quarters are situated at both the campuses.

== Admission and courses ==
The institute is affiliated to West Bengal University of Health Sciences since 2003. Before that it awarded degrees from the University of Calcutta.

It has 200 MBBS seats since 2019 and 89 postgraduate degree seats (in 15 disciplines).

== Student life ==
- There are 5 hostels for boys (Namely: Dr. S.R. Bhattacharya, Dr. B.C. Roy, Junior Boys' Hostel, Chummery and Rabin Hall) and 2 hostels for girls.
- There is one large play ground situated at Gobindanagr campus, just in front of Dr S.R. Bhattacharya hostel, which hosts all intra-college outdoor tournaments. Another two play grounds are situated beside the boys' hostel at Gobindanagar campus and also Lokepur campus respectively.
- All hostels are equipped with a canteen for boys and girls.
- Small grounds inside all hostel campuses are the place to host indoor tournaments like badminton, football, volleyball, short cricket etc.
- All hostels are equipped with common room, but no gym rooms, games room and cable television connections.

== Library ==
The library (>25000 sq.ft area) is situated at the top floor of Nutan Bhaban Building at Gobindanagar campus. There are more than 15,000 medical books and over 3,000 medical journals (more than 120 titles per year). Air-conditioned Computer section has more than 40 computers for UG students and another 10 for resident doctors and staff. Separate Air-conditioned reading rooms for UG students (200 seats inside, 150 seats outside), PG students (78 seats) and staff (50 seats) are available. The whole library is wi-fi zone and totally under CCTV surveillance.

== See also ==
- List of institutions of higher education in West Bengal
- Education in India
- Education in West Bengal
