= Deben Mahata Government Medical College and Hospital =

Medical School and Hospital in Purulia, Purulia District,West Bengal

- Recognition: NMC; INC
- Type: Government Medical College and Hospital
- Established: 2020; 6 years ago
- Academic affiliations: West Bengal University of Health Sciences
- Principal: Dr. Mousumi Bandopadhyay
- Location: Hatuara, Purulia, West Bengal, India; 23.3596°N 86.4003°E
- Website: www.dmgmch.edu.in

Deben Mahata Government Medical College & Hospital (Previously known as Purulia Government Medical College and Hospital) is a full-fledged tertiary referral Government Medical college. It was established in year 2020 at Purulia, in West Bengal. The college is affiliated to West Bengal University of Health Sciences and is recognised by the National Medical Commission. The hospital associated with the college is one of the largest hospitals in the Purulia.

== About college ==
The college imparts the degree Bachelor of Medicine and Surgery (MBBS). Nursing and para-medical courses are also offered. The college is affiliated to West Bengal University of Health Sciences and is recognized by the National Medical Commission. The Super Speciality hospital and Deben Mahata Sadar Hospital are associated with the medical College. The Sadar Hospital is situated at couple of Kilometres away from medical college campus. There is Teaching and Non Teaching Staff Quarter, Resident's Quarter, Nurses Quarter situated in main campus. The Boys' and Girls' hostels are also located within the main college campus. The selection to the college is done on the basis of merit through National Eligibility cum Entrance Test. Yearly undergraduate student intake is 150.

== Courses ==
Deben Mahata Government Medical College, West Bengal undertakes education and training of students MBBS courses. The paramedical and B.Sc nursing courses are also offered.

== See also ==
- List of hospitals in India
