= Midnapore Medical College and Hospital =

Government Medical school and hospital in West Bengal, India

- Recognition: NMC; INC
- Type: Public Medical College & Hospital
- Established: 2004; 22 years ago
- Academic affiliations: West Bengal University of Health Sciences
- Principal: Dr. Mousumi Nandy
- Location: Vidyasagar Rd, Midnapore, West Bengal, 721101, India; 22.4217°N 87.3229°E
- Website: www.midnaporemmc.ac.in
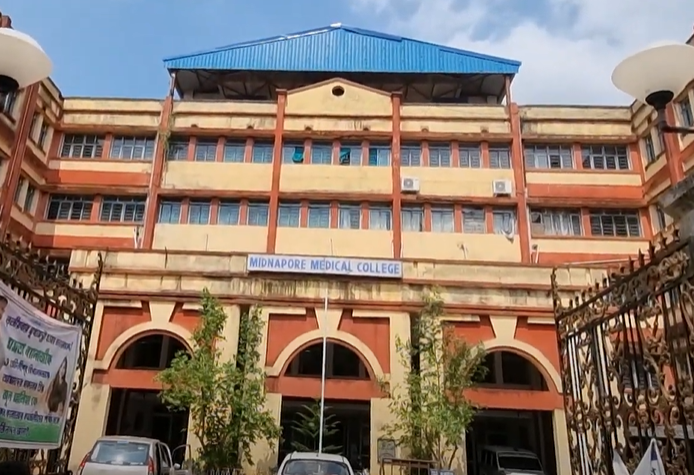

Midnapore Medical College and Hospital is a full-fledged tertiary referral Government Medical college. It was established in the year 2004. The college imparts the degree Bachelor of Medicine and Surgery (MBBS) as well as specialised and post-doctoral degrees. Nursing and para-medical courses (under State Medical Faculty of West Bengal) are also offered. The college is affiliated to West Bengal University of Health Sciences and is recognised by the National Medical Commission. The hospital associated with the college is one of the largest hospitals in the Midnapore district. The selection to the college is done on the basis of merit through National Eligibility and Entrance Test. Yearly undergraduate student intake is 200 from the year 2019. Paramedical Admission is done on basis of merit through SMFWBEE Exam.

== History ==
MMCH was established by the Government of West Bengal in the year 2004. Earlier the college was known as Midnapore Sadar Hospital and offered only medical services. Later, the state government upgraded this hospital into a medical college. With enormous efforts of the West Bengal government, doctors, and medical officers of the Midnapore Sadar Hospital and common people of Midnapore, the first batch of medical students was admitted to this college in the year 2004.

== Courses ==
Midnapore Medical College, West Bengal undertakes education and training of students in MBBS & post graduate courses. Currently, the college has permission to grant post graduate degrees in 9 clinical & non-clinical disciplines. The number of PG courses as well as student per course will be increased in subsequent years with the permission of NMC. Total seats in MD Anaesthesiology - 8, MD General Medicine - 15, MS OBG - 12, MD Pediatrics - 7, MS ENT - 4, MS General Surgery - 14, MS Ophthalmology - 2, MD Pharmacology -2, MD FSM - 2.

== See also ==
- Midnapore Homoeopathic Medical College and Hospital
- List of hospitals in India
