= CNCI =

CNCI usually refers to either:

- The Chittaranjan National Cancer Institute
- The Comprehensive National Cybersecurity Initiative
