= College of Medicine & JNM Hospital =

Medical college and hospital in West Bengal, India

College of Medicine & Jawaharlal Nehru Memorial Hospital
- Motto: Knowledge, Discipline, Service to Humanity
- Recognition: NMC; INC
- Type: Public Medical College & Hospital
- Established: 2009; 17 years ago
- Academic affiliations: West Bengal University of Health Sciences
- Principal: Dr. Manidip Pal
- Students: Totals: MBBS: 150; MD/MS: 3; Paramedical course: DMLT : 20; DRD : 10; DOPT : 10; DCCT : 10; DCLT : 10
- Location: JNM Hospital Road, Kalyani Nadia, West Bengal, 741235, India; 22°58′28″N 88°27′21″E
- Website: comjnmh.ac.in

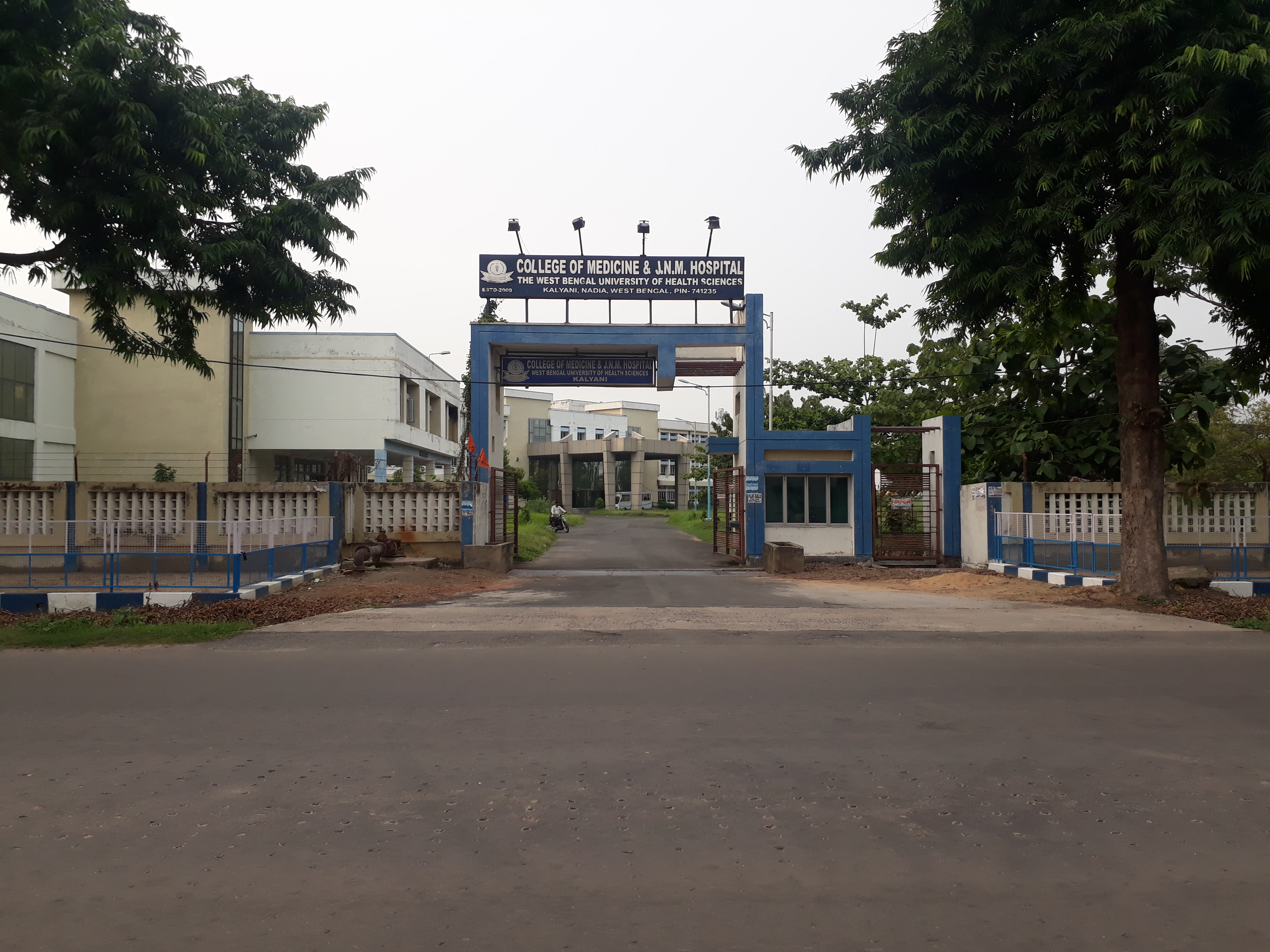
Main Gate (COM & JNM Hospital)

College of Medicine & J.N.M. Hospital is a government medical college and tertiary referral hospital under the West Bengal University of Health Sciences in Kalyani, West Bengal. The college is recognized by the National Medical Commission for MBBS and postgraduate medical degrees in selected subjects. Nursing and other Paramedical courses (under State Medical Faculty of West Bengal) are also offered. The UG Medical Admission is done on basis of merit through NEET. The yearly MBBS intake is 125 from 2019 and Paramedical Admission is done on basis of merit through SMFWBEE Exam.

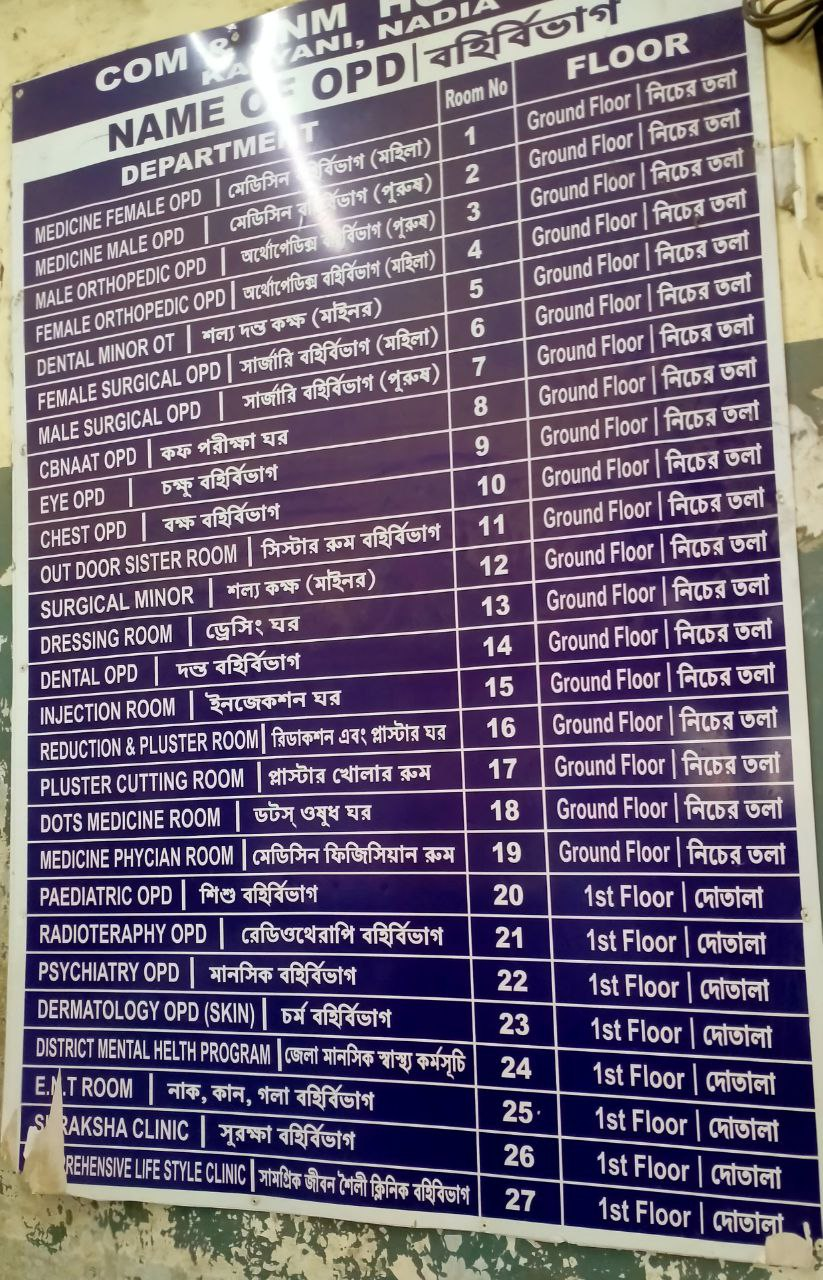

== History ==
The college and hospital are administered by the West Bengal University of Health Sciences. The college was established in 2009 and first registered with the Medical Council of India in 2010. The first batch of 100 students entered in August 2010. In 2013, Gandhi Memorial Hospital was added as second campus to this institute.

=== Principals ===
- Dr. S. Deb
- Dr. H. Dasgupta Saha
- Dr. Dipankar Bhattacharya
- Dr. Santanu Banerjee
- Dr. Subrata Chattopadhyay
- Dr. Keshab Mukhopadhyay
- Dr. Abhijeet Mukherjee
- Dr. Manidip Pal

== Administration ==
The college and hospital is affiliated to West Bengal University of Health Sciences and funded by Government of West Bengal.
