= Murshidabad Medical College and Hospital =

Medical College and Hospital in Berhampore, Murshidabad, West Bengal, India

- Motto in English: Learn and Serve
- Recognition: NMC; INC
- Type: Public Medical College & Hospital
- Established: August 1, 2012; 14 years ago
- Academic affiliations: West Bengal University of Health Sciences
- Principal: Dr. Anadi Roy Chowdhury
- Undergraduates: 150 per year
- Postgraduates: 42 per year
- Location: Berhampore, Murshidabad, West Bengal, India; 24°05′20″N 88°15′32″E
- Campus: Urban
- Website: msdmch.org

Murshidabad Medical College and Hospital is a government-run medical college located in Berhampore, Murshidabad district, West Bengal, India. This college was established in 2012, mainly it serves the people of district Murshidabad, Birbhum and the northern part of Nadia by providing preventive, diagnostic and curative services.

== About College ==
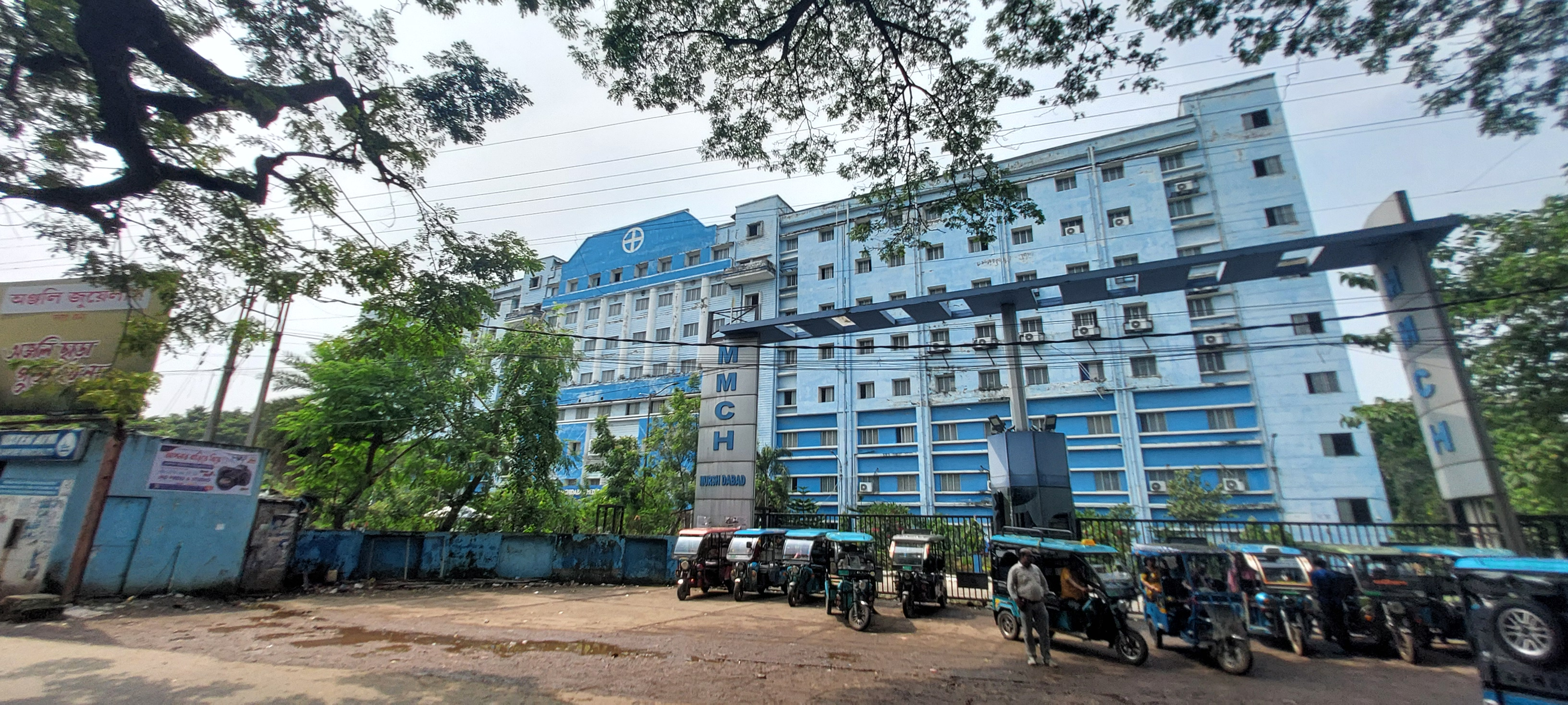
Murshidabad Medical College & Hospital academic building

Students to these seats are admitted through NEET. It is affiliated to West Bengal University of Health Sciences, recognised by National Medical Commission (formerly Medical Council of India) and State Medical Faculty of West Bengal. From 2020 session, it got approval for 24 PG seats.

== Campus ==
The college has two campuses, both in the city of Berhampore. A main campus of 32 acres where the academic building (g+7), administrative block, main hospital building (g+2), OPD building (g+5), Matri Ma (mother and child hub) (g+5), faculty quarters, hostels and other staff quarters are situated. A dedicated cancer block has been developed in this campus. A new 100 bedded block and a CCU block is coming up adjacent to the cancer block. The academic building houses the office of the Principal, central library, air conditioned lecture theatres and the preclinical departments along with their own separate libraries, demonstration rooms, museums and laboratories. There is a central research laboratory and also the Viral Research and Diagnostic Laboratory (VRDL). There is a 600-seater state of the art auditorium situated inside the academic building. It also houses the mortuary and post mortem room maintained by the dept of Forensic Medicine and Toxicology, and a dissection hall maintained by the dept of Anatomy.

The second campus is located at around 2.5 km from the main campus. Here the nursing school is situated. Matri Sadan hospital which has been converted into a 300 bedded Covid hospital is also situated in the same campus.

There are separate hostels for undergraduate boys and girls, intern doctors, resident doctors and post graduate trainees. There are four (as of 2022) canteens to cater to the needs of the students, faculty members and also for the relatives of the patients.

The Nabagram Block Primary Healthcare Centre and urban health care centres under Berhampore municipality are associated with the dept of Community Medicine of the college.

== Campus life ==
Various festivals are celebrated by the students throughout the year.

- Avseende - Teachers' Day celebrations
- Au Revoir - Annual Convocation Ceremony
- Bani Bandana - Saraswati Puja
- Bienvenue - Freshers' Welcome Party
- Chronaxie - The Annual Cultural Festival, in which some other colleges also participate
- Annual Sports meets consisting of Football, Cricket, Badminton, Volleyball, Arm-wrestling, Tug-of-war, Kho-kho, table tennis & other games
- Inizio - White Coat ceremony
- Foundation Day is celebrated on 1 August of every year

== Departments ==
- Anaesthesiology
- Anatomy
- Biochemistry
- Community Medicine
- Dentistry
- Dermatology
- ENT
- Emergency Medicine
- Forensic Medicine and Toxicology
- General Medicine
- General Surgery
- Microbiology
- Obstetrics and Gynaecology
- Ophthalmology
- Orthopaedics
- Paediatric Medicine
- Pathology
- Pharmacology
- Physiology
- Psychiatry
- Physical Medicine and Rehabilitation
- Radiology
- Radiotherapy
- Respiratory Medicine
- School of Nursing
- Government College of Nursing

== Courses ==
- MBBS
- MD
- MS
- GNM Nursing
- Paramedical (DMLT, DRD, DOTT, ECG, DCCT, DOPT) under State Medical Faculty of West Bengal
- BSc Nursing
- MSc Nursing

== See also ==
- List of hospitals in India
