= Barasat Government Medical College and Hospital =

Medical college in India

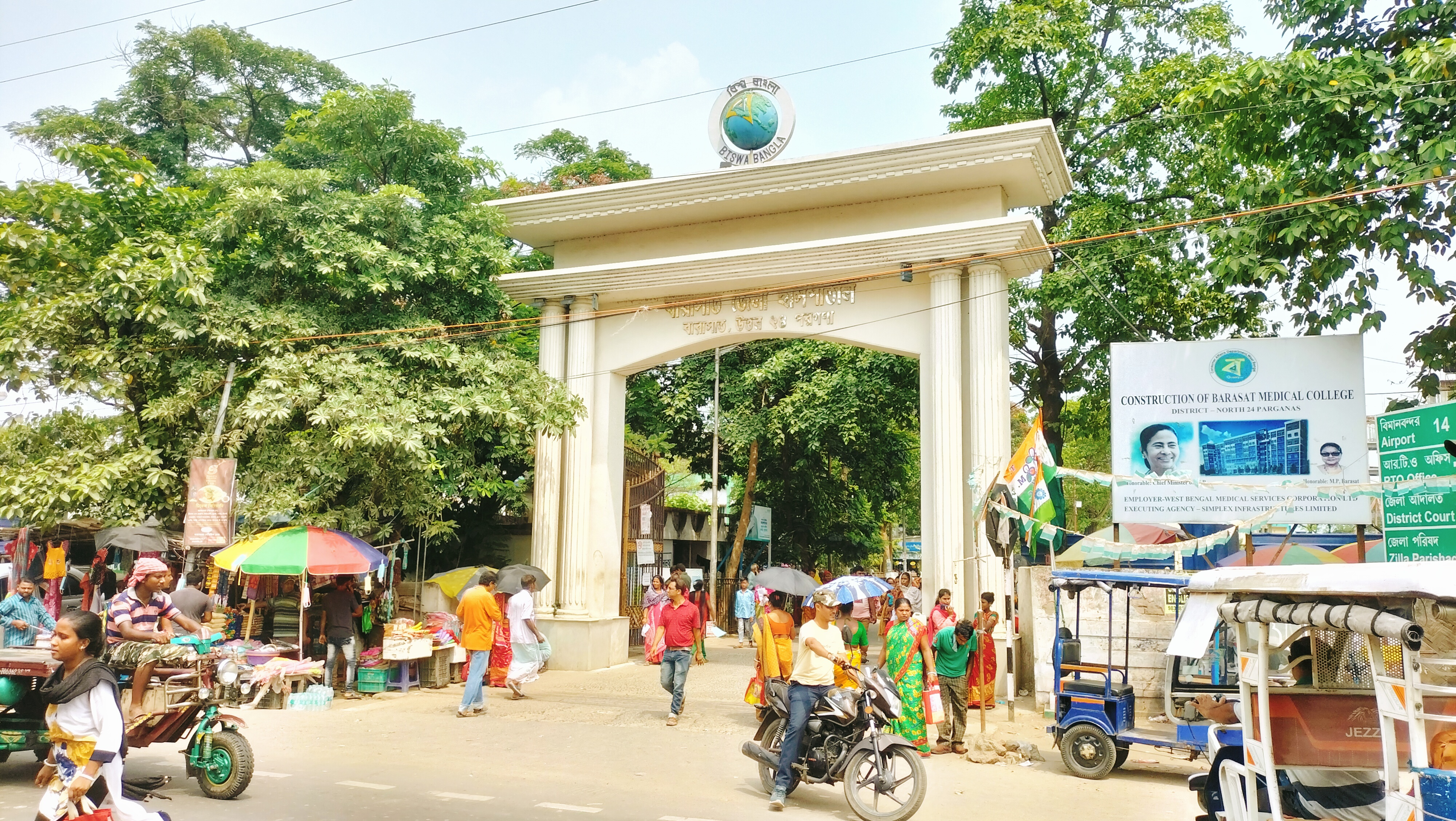
- Recognition: NMC; INC
- Type: Public Medical College and Hospital
- Established: 2022; 4 years ago
- Academic affiliation: West Bengal University of Health Sciences
- Principal: Dr. Suhrita Paul
- Location: Barasat, North 24 Parganas, West Bengal, India
- Campus: Urban (20.5 acres)
- Website: https://barasatgmch.ac.in/

Barasat Government Medical College and Hospital (BGMCH), established in 2022, is a full-fledged tertiary referral Government medical college and hospital. The college is located at Barasat city in North 24 Parganas, West Bengal. The city belongs to the northern suburbs of Kolkata or the Kolkata metropolitan area. The college imparts the degree Bachelor of Medicine and Surgery (MBBS) and associated degrees. This college also offers the Nursing and para-medical courses. The hospital associated with the college is one of the largest hospitals in the North 24 Parganas district.

== Courses ==
Barasat Medical College and Hospital undertakes education and training of 100 students MBBS courses, and a few NBEMS affiliated PG broad-specialty, i.e. DNB and PG diploma, i.e. NBEMS-DIPLOMA courses are also undertaken in this medical college.

== Affiliated ==
The college is affiliated to West Bengal University of Health Sciences and is recognised by the National Medical Commission.
