= Burdwan Dental College and Hospital =

Dental college in West Bengal, Indian

- বর্ধমান ডেন্টাল কলেজ ও হাসপাতাল
- Other names: BDC
- Motto: Latin: Disciplina Dexteritatis Dexteritas
- Motto in English: Discipline Dedication Dexterity
- Type: Govt Dental College & Hospital
- Established: 2009; 17 years ago
- Affiliations: WBUHS, DCI
- Academic affiliations: WBUHS, DCI; West Bengal Dental Council
- Principal: Dr. Jahar Roy
- Academic staff: 400+
- Total staff: 1000+
- Undergraduates: 125/year seat intake BDS
- Postgraduates: NA
- Location: Powerhouse para, Shyamlal Colony, Khosbagan, Purba Bardhaman, West Bengal, 713101, India; 23°14′45.09″N 87°51′36.09″E
- Campus: Urban, approx. 67 acres (27 ha)
- Colors: Light Red, Deep Red, Deep Blue, Light Blue
- Website: https://burdwandentalcollege.edu.in/

Burdwan Dental College and Hospital (BDCH) is a Government hospital & dental college located in the town Burdwan, Purba Bardhaman in the Indian state of West Bengal. It is affiliated with the West Bengal University of Health Sciences and is recognized by Dental Council of India. It offers Bachelor of Dental Science (BDS).

== Departments ==
1. Oral Maxillofacial Surgery

2. Oral Medicine and Radiology

3. Oral Pathology and Microbiology

4. Prosthodontic Crown and Bridges

5. Conservative Dentistry

6. Periodontics

7. Pediatric Dentistry

8. Public Health Dentistry or Community 9.Orthodontics

== Courses and admission ==
Burdwan Dental College and Hospital undertakes the education and training of students in BDS courses for Dental Health Science specially. The yearly undergraduate student intake is 125 from the year 2022.

This college is affiliated to West Bengal University of Health Sciences and is recognised by the Dental Council of India. The selection to the college is done on the basis of merit through National Eligibility and Entrance Test (NEET-UG) exam All India Rank only through All India MCC Counselling for 15% seats and remain 85% seats filled through own West Bengal State Counselling conducted by WBMCC.

== See also ==
- List of hospitals in India
