= Maharaja Jitendra Narayan Medical College and Hospital =

Medical College in Coochbehar, West Bengal

- মহারাজা জিতেন্দ্র নারায়ণ মেডিকেল কলেজ ও হাসপাতাল
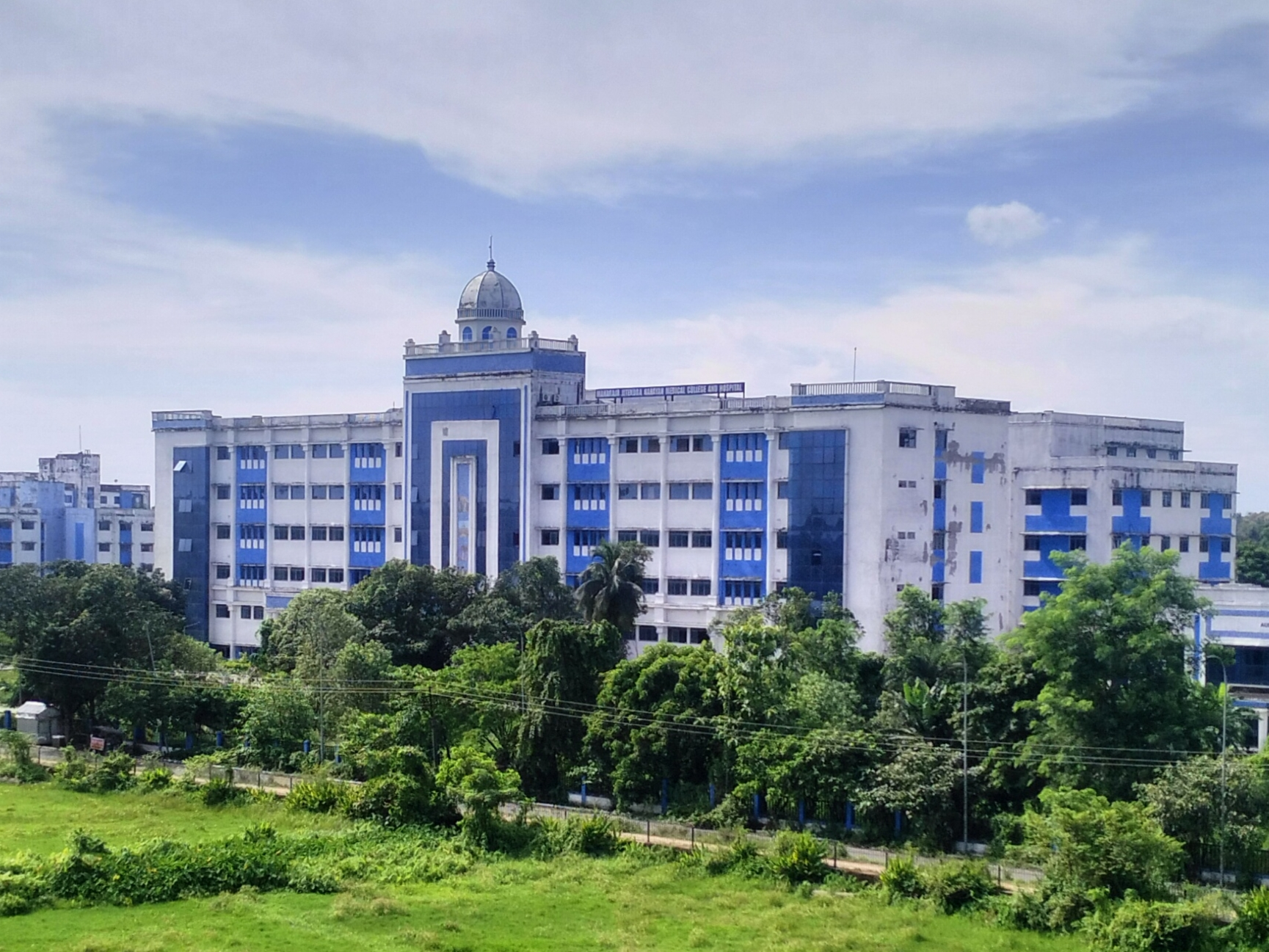
- MJNMCH in July 2026
- Recognition: NMC; INC
- Type: Government Medical College & Hospital
- Established: 22 February 2018; 8 years ago
- Academic affiliations: West Bengal University of Health Sciences
- Principal: Dr. Achintya Narayan Ray
- Location: Coochbehar, West Bengal, India; 26°19′17″N 89°27′57″E
- Campus: Urban
- Website: www.mjnmch.ac.in

Maharaja Jitendra Narayan Medical College and Hospital (MJNMCH) (previously, Cooch Behar Government Medical College & Hospital), is a full-fledged tertiary referral Government Medical college cum hospital. It was established in the year 2018. The college imparts the degree Bachelor of Medicine and Surgery (MBBS). Nursing and para-medical courses (under State Medical Faculty of West Bengal) are also offered. The college is affiliated to West Bengal University of Health Sciences and is recognised by the National Medical Commission. The MJN hospital associated with the college is one of the largest hospitals in the Coochbehar. The selection to the college is done on the basis of merit through National Eligibility and Entrance Test. Paramedical Admission is done on basis of merit through SMFWBEE Exam.

== Courses ==
Maharaja Jitendra Narayan Medical College & Hospital (MJNMCH), Cooch Behar, West Bengal undertakes education and training of 150 students MBBS courses.

- 1. MBBS: with the capacity of 150 seats
- 2. Paramedical courses (DMLT, DOPT, DOTT)
- 3. GNM Nursing

== Hospital ==
Previously the hospital was known as MJN Hospital, Coochbehar. It was a district hospital. It is the largest government hospital of Coochbehar. The hospital contains outpatient system and indoor patient system with around 500 beds. It has separate Medicine, Surgery, Paediatric and Gynaecology ward. Matrima is a separate building for the pregnant mother and newborn. This building contains Gynae casualty room, Gynae OT, Prenatal area, postnatal area, SNCU, PICU with adequate nursing staff and modern medical technology. Medicine and Surgery department have separate male and female wards. Hospital also has own modern radiology department with X-RAY, USG, CT and MRI. The name of the present Principal and Medical Superintendent-cum-Vice Principal (MSVP) of the institution is Dr. Achintya Narayan Ray and Dr. Tanay Mohanta, respectively.
