= Chittaranjan National Cancer Institute =

Cancer treatment and research institution in Kolkata, India

- Type: Public Oncologic emergency center
- Established: 2 January 1950; 76 years ago
- Accreditation: NABH recognised Regional Cancer Centre
- Affiliations: National Medical Commission
- Academic affiliations: WBUHS; NBEMS; Jadavpur University
- Endowment: ₹162.26 crore (US$16.8 million) (2023–24)
- Director: Dr. Jayanta Chakrabarti
- Location: * Old Campus: 37, S.P. Mukherjee Road (near Jatin Das Park Metro Station and Hazra Crossing) Kolkata-700026: New Town Campus: DJ Block, Action Area I, Street Number 299, New Town, Kolkata, West Bengal, India; 22°34′01″N 88°27′52″E
- Website: www.cnci.ac.in
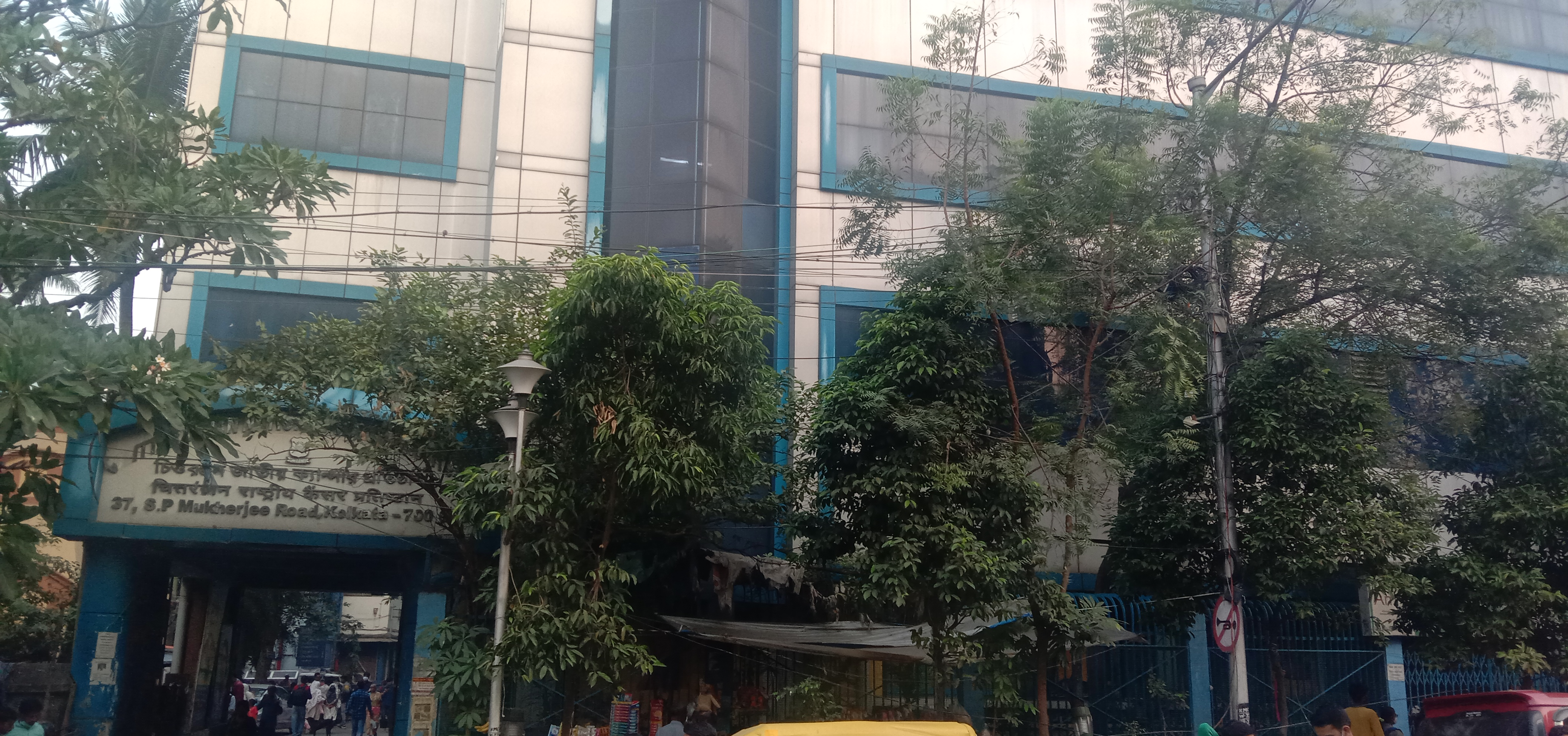

Chittaranjan National Cancer Institute (CNCI) is a 660 bedded cancer care hospital and research institute and one of the 27 regional cancer centres in India. It is located in Kolkata near Jatin Das Park metro station at Hazra crossing. It was formally inaugurated by Irène Joliot-Curie on 12 January 1950, as Chittaranjan Cancer Hospital, named after Chittaranjan Das, who donated land and property for the cause. This campus (first campus) also serves as a cancer research centre.

== History ==
The origins of CNCI trace back to the establishment of the Chittaranjan Cancer Hospital (CCH), which was formally inaugurated on 12 January 1950, by Nobel laureate Irène Joliot-Curie. The hospital was founded with the support of Dr. B.C. Roy, an eminent physician and then Chief Minister of West Bengal, and named in honor of Chittaranjan Das, who donated land and property for the cause. Initially focused on cancer treatment, the hospital expanded its scope to include basic and clinical research with funding from government organizations.

In 1957, the Chittaranjan National Cancer Research Centre (CNCRC) was established, funded by the Government of India, to focus on cancer biology research, particularly for prevalent cancers such as oral cavity and cervical cancers. The CCH and CNCRC operated as separate entities in adjacent buildings until 1987, when they merged to form the Chittaranjan National Cancer Institute (CNCI). This merger aimed to create a premier Regional Cancer Centre for Eastern India, combining advanced treatment facilities with cutting-edge research. The first director of CNCI was Dr. Jayashree Roychoudhury.

== Campuses ==
=== Hazra Campus (First Campus) ===
Location Near Jatin Das Park metro station at Hazra Crossing, Kolkata. A 200-bed hospital with advanced diagnostic and treatment services, including surgery, chemotherapy, and radiation therapy. This campus also serves as a hub for cancer research. The original campus remains a critical facility for patient care and research, despite being under significant patient load due to its central location.

=== Rajarhat Campus (Second Campus) ===
In February 2014 Union Government cabinet approved expansion of the state-of-the-art institutes second campus estimated cost of ₹ 530 crore. In 2020, during the COVID-19 pandemic, the entire Rajarhat campus was temporarily converted into a dedicated COVID-19 hospital to support West Bengal’s preparedness efforts. On 19 August 2020 the institute started its OPD services from its 460 bedded campus at Rajarhat. The campus at Newtown was built under the Union Ministry of Health. The building is equipped with all the latest facilities for cancer treatment including nuclear medicine, endoscopy suite, modern brachytherapy units, 650 beds (or 460 beds), accommodations for relatives of patients, and for doctors. Rs 1,000 crore was spent for this project and it was inaugurated by Prime Minister Narendra Modi on 7 January 2022. More than ₹530 crore has been spent, out of which around ₹400 crore have been provided by the Union government and the rest by the Government of West Bengal. In June 2023, the Rajarhat campus became the first cancer care center under the Ministry of Health and Family Welfare to receive NABH (National Accreditation Board for Hospitals) certification, ensuring high standards of patient care and safety.

== Medical Services ==
CNCI provides a wide range of oncology services, focusing on affordability and accessibility, particularly for underprivileged and lower-middle-class patients. Surgical Oncology advanced procedures, including stereotactic radiosurgery, which was performed for the first time in a West Bengal government hospital in February 2023 to remove a brain tumor in a septuagenarian patient. Radiation Oncology equipped with high-energy linear accelerators and modern brachytherapy units. Medical Oncology chemotherapy and immunotherapy, with research indicating the need for patient screening before administering costly immunotherapy treatments. Advanced imaging (MRI, CT, X-ray), pathology, and nuclear medicine. Community outreach programs for cancer prevention and early detection. Palliative Care Support for patients with advanced cancer to improve quality of life.

== Administration and Governance ==
CNCI operates as an autonomous body under the Ministry of Health and Family Welfare, Government of India, with a governing body chaired by the Union Minister of Health and Family Welfare. The Minister of Health and Family Welfare, Government of West Bengal, serves as the alternate chairman.

== Education & training ==
CNCI is a leading institution for oncology education, offering a variety of accredited courses under affiliations with the West Bengal University of Health Sciences (WBUHS), National Board of Examinations in Medical Sciences (NBEMS), and Jadavpur University.

=== Postgraduate Courses ===
MD in Lab Medicine and Radiation Oncology (recognized by the National Medical Commission, started in 2022). DNB (Diplomate of National Board) in Head & Neck Oncology, Pathology, and Gynecological Oncology.

=== Super-Specialty Courses ===
M.Ch in Surgical Oncology (started in 2022). Post-Doctoral Fellowship in Onco-Anesthesia.

=== Diploma and Certificate Courses ===
Post M.Sc. Diploma in Medical Physics (in collaboration with Jadavpur University, started in 2022). Diploma in Radiological Technology and Radio Diagnosis. Post Basic Diploma in Oncology Nursing.

=== Admission ===
Admissions to MD, MS, and super-specialty courses are based on NEET PG and NEET SS scores, with counseling conducted by the Medical Counselling Committee (MCC) and West Bengal state authorities. The institute has a total seat intake of seven for its MD, M.Ch, and Ph.D. programs, focusing on quality education in medicine and health sciences.

=== Academic Units ===
Departments of CNCI Kolkata
- Anesthesiology and Critical care
- Medical oncology
- Laboratory medicine
- Head & Neck Oncology
- Gynaecological Oncology
- Radiation Oncology
- Surgical oncology
- Hemato-Oncology
- Radio-Diagnosis
- Medical physics
- Cancer research
- Pathology

== Recognition and Achievements ==
First Stereotactic Radiosurgery in a Government Hospital Performed in February 2023, this procedure marked a historic achievement for West Bengal's public healthcare system.

CNCI's research on Immunotherapy screening and nanotechnology has gained national and international recognition.
