= IQ City Medical College =

Medical school in Durgapur, West Bengal

- Motto: Blessed Are The Healers
- Type: Private Medical College and Hospital
- Established: 2013; 13 years ago
- Affiliations: WBUHS, NMC
- President: Sanjay Jhunjhunwala
- Principal: Dr. Arindom Banerjee
- Students: Totals: MBBS - 250
- Location: Durgapur, Paschim Bardhaman district, West Bengal, 713206, India; 23.5705034°N 87.3357442°E
- Website: https://medical.iqcity.in/

IQ City Medical College and Hospital, established in 2013, is a private medical college located in Durgapur, West Bengal, India. This medical college hospital is a part of IQ City in Durgapur. This college offers the Bachelor of Medicine and Bachelor of Surgery (MBBS) courses. It is affiliated with the West Bengal University of Health Sciences and recognized by the National Medical Commission. The annual intake of this college in the MBBS course is 250 as on 2024-25 Academic Year.

This college is situated in Bijra.
