= Jalpaiguri Government Medical College and Hospital =

Medical school in West Bengal, India

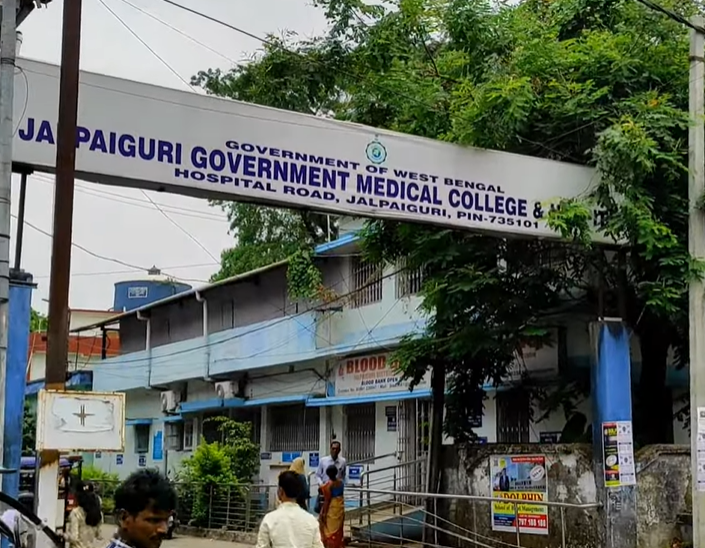
- Recognition: NMC; INC
- Type: Public Medical College & Hospital
- Established: 2022; 4 years ago
- Academic affiliation: West Bengal University of Health Sciences
- Principal: Dr. Prabir Kumar Deb
- Address: GPHG+XM2, Hospital Road, Jalpaiguri, West Bengal 735101, Jalpaiguri, West Bengal, 735101, India; 26.5428°N 88.7069°E
- Campus: Urban
- Website: jgmch.edu.in

Jalpaiguri Government Medical College and Hospital, established in 2022, is a full-fledged tertiary referral Government Medical college. It is located at Jalpaiguri town of West Bengal. The college imparts the degree of Bachelor of Medicine and Surgery (MBBS). The hospital associated with the college is one of the largest hospitals in the Jalpaiguri district. The yearly undergraduate student intake is 100 from the year 2022.

== Courses ==
Jalpaiguri Medical College and Hospital undertakes education and training of 100 students MBBS courses.

== Affiliations ==
The college is affiliated with West Bengal University of Health Sciences and is recognized by the National Medical Commission.
