= Malda Medical College and Hospital =

Medical College and Hospital in India

- Recognition: NMC; INC
- Type: Public Medical College and Hospital
- Established: 2011; 15 years ago
- Academic affiliations: West Bengal University of Health Sciences
- Principal: Dr. Partha Pratim Mukhopadhyay
- Students: Total: MBBS - 150; MD - 16; MS - 14
- Location: Singatala, Uma Roy Sarani, Malda Town, West Bengal, 732101, India; 24.9925941°N 88.1407162°E
- Campus: Urban
- Website: www.maldamedicalcollege.co.in

Malda Medical College and Hospital (MMC&H) is a medical college run by the government of West Bengal in Malda, West Bengal, India. It is recognised by the National Medical Commission and affiliated to West Bengal University of Health Sciences. The college was established in 2011.

== History ==
Considering the dearth of medical professionals in West Bengal with a doctor:population ratio of 1:2600, the government of West Bengal decided to start a new medical college of 100 MBBS student capacity, to cater specially to the population of rural Bengal. It was built in a strategic location of Malda District, which is the gateway to North Bengal; it could also cater to the adjacent districts.

After the inspection by MCI team in 2011, a letter of permission was received by the Authority of Malda Medical College & Hospital on 30 June 2011. Classes for the first year commenced on 1 August 2011.

West Bengal Medical Services Corporation Limited (wholly owned by the government of West Bengal) is the client of the project. The construction work was started in November 2010. At first the implementing agency was Punj Lloyd Limited. Mackintosh Burn Limited was then engaged by the government of West Bengal as Punj Lloyd Limited was not able to complete the work in time.

== Campus ==
=== Location ===
The college is located in Uma Roy Sarani, Malda, near Hantakali More Malda .

Camera location	25° 00′ 40.19″ N, 88° 08′ 23.38″ E

Malda, the district headquarters which lends its name to the district, during its early days grew up only near the side of the river Mahananda, and now the place is known as Phulbari. Some of the oldest houses can be found here. The city started to grow in 1925-1930. Now nearly a half million people live in this city, and it is one of the biggest cities of West Bengal. It is a part of the former Gour. The town is recognised as the English Bazaar municipality. Its notable railway station is named as Malda Town.

The latitude range is 24°40’20" N to 25°32’08" N, and the longitude range is 87°45’50" E to 88°28’10" E. The district covers an area of 3,733.66 square kilometres (1,441.6 sq mi). The total population (as of the 2001 Census) was recorded as 3,290,160.

Malda is called the gateway of North Bengal. It was once the capital of Gour-Banga with its 3,733 square kilometres (1,441 sq mi) of land classified into Tal, Diara, and Barind.

To the south is Murshidabad district, to the north are North Dinajpur district and South Dinajpur district. To the east is the international border with Bangladesh. To the west is Santhal Parganas of Jharkhand and Purnea of Bihar.

=== Infrastructure ===
- The total campus area is approx. 70000 sq.m.
- The Academic Building (G+7) of floor area approx. 24000sq.m has a central library, lecture theaters (including one air-conditioned lecture theater), demonstration rooms and practical laboratories along with the auditorium (with 660 seat capacity), examination hall, air-conditioned library, e-library and the morgue.
- New Trauma Care buildings have been constructed with modern facilities and emergency safety features.8 super speciality OTs. Currently Covid19 OPD, Quarantine ward and detection done here
- The old hospital building (G+2) is being renovated for providing better patient care services and new OPD building (G+9) also constructed to facilitate all OPD services. OPD timings are from 9am to 2pm.
- The Central Library in the new Academic Building (at 1st and 2nd floor) houses books along with foreign journals and has high-speed internet facility for e-library facility.
- Hospital blood bank and fair price medicine shop
- Separate hostels for boys and girls with option for availing cable broadband internet and also free jio wifi campus.
- Hostel for interns.
- Hostel for Resident Doctors
- Different type of Quarters for Teaching and Non Teaching Staffs, Nurses ...etc
- The canteen serves both vegetarian and non-vegetarian foods of various types.

The campus area is owned by the Health Department of Government of West Bengal. It includes the following:

- New OPD Building (G+8)
- New academic building
- New hospital buildings
- Trauma centre
- Isolation wards
- Residential quarters - Type I Quarter (G+8) & Type II Quarter (G+8)
- Student hostel (G+4) with separate common room for boys and girls, and interns hostel (G+4)
- ART Center
- Blood bank

== Academics ==
=== Academic programmes ===
Post graduate:

MD Pediatrics (3 years)- 5 seats, MS Obstetrics and Gynaecology(3 years)- 6 seats, MD Microbiology (3 years)- 3 seats MD General Medicine - 4 seats, MS General Surgery - 4 seats, MD Biochemistry - 4 seats MS Ophthalmology - 4 seats

Under graduate:

- MBBS (4.5 years course + 1 year compulsory rotatory internship)- 125 seats.

Diploma:

- Nursing

GNM nursing course (3years course +6months internship)

Diploma

- Paramedical courses under State Medical Faculty of West Bengal
- Diploma in Medical Laboratory Technology (Pathology, Microbiology & Biochemistry): DMLT (Tech): 2 years + 6 months compulsory post examination training
- Diploma in Radiography (Diagnostic): DRD (Tech): 2 years + 6 months compulsory post examination training
- Diploma in Physiotherapy: DPT: 2 years + 6 months compulsory post examination training.
- Diploma in Optometry with Ophthalmic Technique: D.OPT: 2 years + 6 months compulsory post examination training
- Diploma in Critical Care Technology: DCCT: 2 years + 6 months compulsory post examination training
- Diploma In Operation Theatre Technology: DOTT: 2 years + 6 months compulsory post examination training.
- Diploma In Electrocardiographic Technique: ECG Technician: 2 years + 6 months compulsory post examination training

== Departments ==
The medical college has the following departments:

- Pre-clinical
  - Anatomy
  - Physiology
  - Biochemistry
- Para-clinical
  - Pathology
  - Microbiology
  - Forensic Medicine & Toxicology
  - Community Medicine
  - Pharmacology
- Clinical
  - General Medicine
  - General Surgery
  - Obstetrics & Gynaecology
  - Paediatrics
  - Ophthalmology
  - Otorhinolaryngology
  - Anaesthesiology
  - Dermatology
  - Radiology
  - Psychiatry
  - Orthopaedics & PMR
  - ENT
  - Neurosurgery

== College life ==
Every year many occasions are celebrated by the students like

BEATS - Annual Cultural Festival

NEXUS - Annual Fresher's Program

GENESIS - Annual Academic Festival

Foundation day - 1st of August

Saraswati Puja

== See also ==
- List of hospitals in India
