= Jhargram Government Medical College and Hospital =

Government Medical college and hospital, Jhargram, Jhargram District

- Motto: Sarve Santu Nirāmayāḥ (Sanskrit); Let all be free from disease and disability
- Recognition: NMC; INC
- Type: Public Medical College and Hospital
- Established: 2021; 5 years ago
- Academic affiliations: West Bengal University of Health Sciences
- Principal: Dr. Indira Dey (Pal)
- Location: Jhargram, West Bengal, India
- Campus: 30 acres (12 ha); Urban
- Website: jgmch.ac.in

Jhargram Government Medical College and Hospital (JGMCH) is a Government Medical college and hospital. The college is located at Jhargram city in Jhargram district, West Bengal, India. The college offers the degree Bachelor of Medicine and Surgery (MBBS) and associated degrees. The college is affiliated with West Bengal University of Health Sciences and is recognized by the National Medical Commission.
