= Sarat Chandra Chattopadhyay Government Medical College and Hospital =

Medical college in India

- Other names: Uluberia Medical College and Hospital
- Recognition: NMC; INC
- Type: Public Medical College & Hospital
- Established: 2022; 4 years ago
- Academic affiliations: West Bengal University of Health Sciences
- Principal: Dr. Munmun Das (Sarkar)
- Location: Uluberia, Howrah, West Bengal, India
- Campus: Urban
- Website: sccgmch.ac.in

Sarat Chandra Chattopadhyay Medical College and Hospital (SCCGMCH), established in 2022, is a full-fledged tertiary referral Government medical college and hospital. This college is located at the Uluberia city in Howrah district, West Bengal. This college imparts the degree Bachelor of Medicine and Surgery (MBBS) and associated degrees. This college also offers the Nursing and para-medical courses. The hospital associated with the college is one of the largest hospitals in the Howrah district.

== Courses ==
Sarat Chandra Chattopadhyay Medical College and Hospital undertakes education and training of 100 students in MBBS courses.

== Affiliated ==
The college is affiliated to the West Bengal University of Health Sciences and is recognised by the National Medical Commission.
