= Prafulla Chandra Sen Government Medical College and Hospital =

- Other names: Arambagh Medical College and Hospital
- Recognition: NMC; INC
- Type: Government Medical College & Hospital
- Established: 2022; 4 years ago
- Academic affiliations: West Bengal University of Health Sciences
- Principal: Dr. Ramaprasad Roy
- Location: Arambagh, Hooghly district, West Bengal, India
- Campus: 20.128 Acre; Urban
- Website: pcsgmch.ac.in

Prafulla Chandra Sen Government Medical College and Hospital (PCSGMCH), established in 2022, is a full-fledged tertiary Government Medical college and hospital. It is located at Arambagh city in Hooghly district, West Bengal. The college imparts the degree of Bachelor of Medicine and Surgery (MBBS). The hospital associated with the college is one of the largest hospitals in the Hooghly district. Yearly undergraduate student intake is 100 from the year 2022.

== Courses ==
Prafulla Chandra Sen Medical College and Hospital undertakes education and training of 100 students MBBS courses.

== Affiliated ==
The college is affiliated with West Bengal University of Health Sciences and is recognized by the National Medical Commission.

== Campus ==
The college campus have an 7 storied Academic Building, 10 storied each Boys Hostel and Girls Hostel, 10 storied Teaching Staff Quarter, and 10 storied Non-teaching staff Quarter, 7 stories Nurse's Quarter, 5 storied Superspeciality Block, 10 Storied New OPD Complex, old Sub Divisional Hospital building and play ground.

Recently, a 100 bedded COVID ward was also developed. There will be likely the ICU and CCU in future.
