= Bengal Homoeopathic Medical College and Hospital =

Medical school and hospital in West Bengal, India

Bengal Homoeopathic Medical College & Hospital
- Motto: श्रद्धावान् लभते ज्ञानम् (Sanskrit) śhraddhāvān labhate jñānaṁ (ISO)
- Motto in English: The earnest aspirant gains supreme wisdom
- Type: Private Homeopathy Medical College & Hospital
- Established: 1980; 46 years ago
- Academic affiliations: WBUHS; NCH
- Principal: Dipankar Roy
- Director: Rohini Kumar Mandal
- Students: Totals: BHMS - 50
- Location: Asansol, West Bengal, India; 23°40′14″N 86°57′59″E
- Campus: Urban (2.8 Acres)
- Website: bhmch.org

Bengal Homoeopathic Medical College and Hospital is a homeopathic medical college in Asansol West Bengal, India. it was established in 1980. It offers the Bachelor of Homeopathic Medicine and Surgery (BHMS) degree course. This college is recognized by the National Commission for Homoeopathy (NCH), Ministry of Ayush and affiliated with the West Bengal University of Health Sciences.

Homeopathy was introduced in India the early 19th century. It flourished in Bengal at first, and then spread all over India. In the beginning, the system was extensively practiced by amateurs in the civil and military services and others. Mahendra Lal Sircar was the first Indian who became a homeopathic physician.
