= Rampurhat Government Medical College and Hospital =

Medical college in West Bengal

- Recognition: NMC; INC
- Type: Public Medical College & Hospital
- Established: 2018; 8 years ago
- Academic affiliations: West Bengal University of Health Sciences
- Principal: Dr. Karabi Baral
- Students: Totals: MBBS - 100
- Location: Rampurhat, Birbhum, West Bengal, India
- Website: www.rampurhatgmch.edu.in

Rampurhat Government Medical College and Hospital (RPHGMCH) is a tertiary referral Government Medical college. It was established in the year 2018. The college imparts the degree Bachelor of Medicine and Surgery (MBBS). The college is affiliated to West Bengal University of Health Sciences and is recognized by the National Medical Commission. The hospital associated with the college is one of the largest hospitals in the Birbhum district. The selection to the college is done on the basis of merit through NEET (UG).

Yearly undergraduate student intake is 100 from the year 2019.
