= Tamralipto Government Medical College and Hospital =

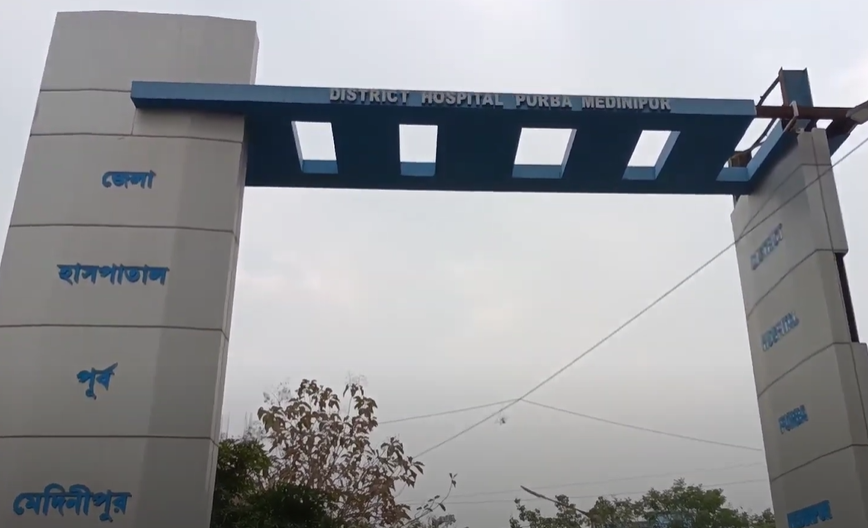
- Recognition: NMC; INC
- Type: Public Medical College & Hospital
- Established: August 26, 2022; 4 years ago
- Academic affiliations: West Bengal University of Health Sciences
- Principal: Dr. Indra Datta
- Undergraduates: 100 per year
- Location: Hospital More, Tamluk, Purba Medinipur, West Bengal, India; 22.28699°N 87.91942°E
- Campus: Urban
- Website: http://tgmch.ac.in/

Tamralipto Government Medical College and Hospital (TGMCH), established in 2022, is a full-fledged tertiary referral Government medical college and hospital. This college is located at Tamluk city in Purba Medinipur district, West Bengal. This college imparts the degree Bachelor of Medicine and Surgery (MBBS) and associated degrees. This college also offers the Nursing and para-medical courses. The hospital associated with the college is one of the largest hospitals in the Purba Medinipur district.

== Courses ==
Tamralipto Medical College and Hospital undertakes education and training of 100 students in MBBS course.

== Affiliated ==
The college is affiliated to West Bengal University of Health Sciences and is recognised by the National Medical Commission.
