= West Bengal University of Health Sciences =

Public medical university in West Bengal, India

- Motto: Diligence leads to Excellence
- Type: Public Medical University
- Established: 1 January 2003; 23 years ago
- Academic affiliations: UGC; AIU
- Budget: ₹145.12 crore (US$15.5 million) (2026–27)
- Chancellor: Governor of West Bengal
- Vice-Chancellor: Dr. Mukul Bhattacharya
- Location: Kolkata, West Bengal, India; 22°35′30″N 88°24′44″E
- Campus: DD-36, Salt Lake, Sector-1, Kolkata-700064
- Journal: Journal of the West Bengal University of Health Sciences
- Website: www.wbuhs.ac.in

West Bengal University of Health Sciences (abbr. WBUHS) (Bengali pronunciation: [poʃtʃimbɔŋɡo ʃastʰobidɡjan biʃʃobiddaːlɔe̯]) is a Public medical university in Kolkata, West Bengal, India. It was established in 2003 by an Act of the West Bengal Legislative Assembly for better management of the health and medical education-related courses. The main objective behind the establishment of the university was to raise the level of medical education across the state of West Bengal. Universities main mission was to affiliate, teach, and ensure systematic instruction, training, and research in various health sciences, including Modern Medicine, Homoeopathy, Ayurveda, Unani, Nursing, Pharmacy, Dental, and Paramedical courses. It oversees undergraduate, postgraduate, and post-doctoral programs across these disciplines in West Bengal.

== History ==
Before the establishment of the West Bengal University of Health Sciences (WBUHS), undergraduate and postgraduate level medical teaching in different state medical colleges of West Bengal was supervised by various state universities. This caused a huge disparity between different state medical colleges of West Bengal in terms of teaching and learning process, nature and standards of the evaluation, and most significantly; the recognition of the graduates from the different universities. So all the stakeholders of medical education in the state felt the need for bringing parity in the medical education system.

Under these compelling circumstances, the West Bengal University of Health Sciences (WBUHS) was established under an Act of the West Bengal legislature. Finally, it became active on 1 January 2003; which is considered as the date of birth for this embodiment of higher education in the fields of medical sciences in the state.

University introduced medical research grants for undergraduate, postgraduate, and faculty members, aligning with standard ICMR frameworks. This academic initiative accompanied institutional reforms aimed at standardizing examination timelines and strengthening collaborations with peripheral medical colleges.

The West Bengal government has invested ₹102.75 crore in a new multi-story building at the West Bengal University of Health Sciences (WBUHS). Officially inaugurated in March 2026, the modern facility centralizes several key administrative offices to streamline institutional operations. Additionally, it features state-of-the-art seminar halls designed to enhance academic research, conferences, and collaborative healthcare education.

== Organisation and administration ==
=== Governance ===
The Governor of West Bengal is the Chancellor of the WBUHS serving ex-officio, presides over convocations, issues directions, calls for information, and can inspect or inquire into university affairs, with powers to suspend or modify resolutions and disqualify members. The Vice-Chancellor of the West Bengal University of Health Sciences is the chief executive officer of the university, exercises Executive Council powers for management, ensures compliance with the Act and regulations, convenes meetings, and represents the university legally.

The governance structure of WBUHS is robust, balancing centralized control through state-level councils and decentralized management via local committees. This framework supports its mission to enhance health sciences education, with clear roles for policy-making, academic oversight, and financial management, ensuring accountability and efficiency.

Institution introduced new Standard Operating Procedures for postgraduate medical examinations. The guidelines established strict answer script evaluation protocols and enforced timed, digital tabulation entry.

=== Affiliations ===
The West Bengal University of Health Science is an affiliating university and has jurisdiction over all the medical, dental, AYUSH, paramedical & allied health sciences, nursing & pharmacy colleges of the entire state of West Bengal.Though some private med schools running under private university affiliation still it has 124 affiliated institutions under its umbrella as of now.

== Ranking and reputation ==
In September 2017, West Bengal University of Health Sciences was recognized by the UGC, under section 12-B of the UGC Act, 1956.

WBUHS focusing research in biological sciences, chemistry, and health sciences, university appears in the Nature Index, which tracks high-quality scientific articles. WBUHS ranks 185 in India overall, with varying positions in subject areas like in biological sciences 53rd and in health sciences 48th.

Nature Index Rankings in India
Ranking	2026	2025
Biological sciences	54	53
Health sciences	61	48

== Affiliated Institutions and Network ==
=== Affiliated Pharmacy Colleges ===
S.No	College Name	Location	District	Establishment Year	No. Of Seats(B.Pharm)	Stream
1	Haldia Institute of Pharmacy	Haldia	Purba Medinipur	2018	100	Pharmacy
2	Institute of Pharmacy, Jalpaiguri	Jalpaiguri	Jalpaiguri	2003(since B.Pharm. started offering)	60	Pharmacy

=== Affiliated private medical colleges ===
S.No	College name	Location	District	Established year	No. of Seats (MBBS)	Stream
1	KPC Medical College and Hospital	Jadavpur	Kolkata	2006	200	Allopathy
2	ICARE Institute of Medical Sciences and Research	Haldia	Purba Medinipur	2011	200	Allopathy
3	Shri Ramkrishna Institute of Medical Sciences and Sanaka Hospital	Durgapur	Paschim Bardhaman	2015	250	Allopathy
4	Gouri Devi Institute of Medical Sciences and Hospital	Durgapur	Paschim Bardhaman	2016	200	Allopathy
5	IQ City Medical College	Durgapur	Paschim Bardhaman	2016	150	Allopathy
6	Jagannath Gupta Institute of Medical Sciences and Hospital	Budge Budge	South 24 Parganas	2016	250	Allopathy
7	Santiniketan Medical College	Santiniketan	Birbhum	2021	150	Allopathy
8	JMN Medical College and Hospital	Chakdaha	Nadia	2023	150	Allopathy
9	Krishnanagar Institute of Medical Sciences	Krishnanagar	Nadia	2024	250	Allopathy
10	East West Institute of Medical Sciences and Research	Burdwan	Purba Bardhaman	2024	50	Allopathy
11	Jakir Hossain Medical College and Research Institute	Jangipur	Murshidabad	2024	100	Allopathy
12	PKG Medical College and Hospital	New Town	North 24 Parganas	2025	50	Allopathy
13	Jagannath Gupta Institute of Medical Sciences and Hospital	Sodepur	North 24 Parganas	2025	100	Allopathy
14	Raniganj Institute of Medical Sciences	Raniganj	Paschim Bardhaman	2025	200	Allopathy

=== Affiliated private medical colleges (Non-Profit) ===
S. No.	College name	Location	District	Established year	No. of Seats (MBBS)	Stream
1	Vivekananda Institute of Medical Sciences	Lansdowne	Kolkata	1963	44 (MD/MS)	Allopathy

=== Government Medical Colleges (Allopathy) ===
S. No.	College name	Location	District	Established year	No. of Seats (MBBS)	Stream
1	Medical College and Hospital	College Street	Kolkata	1835	250	Allopathy
2	Nil Ratan Sarkar Medical College and Hospital	Sealdah	Kolkata	1873	250	Allopathy
3	R. G. Kar Medical College and Hospital	Shyambazar	Kolkata	1886	250	Allopathy
4	Calcutta National Medical College	Beniapukur	Kolkata	1948	250	Allopathy
5	Bankura Sammilani Medical College and Hospital	Bankura	Bankura	1956	200	Allopathy
6	IPGMER and SSKM Hospital	Kolkata	Kolkata	1957	250	Allopathy
7	North Bengal Medical College and Hospital	Siliguri	Darjeeling	1968	250	Allopathy
8	Burdwan Medical College	Burdwan	Purba Bardhaman	1969	250	Allopathy
9	Midnapore Medical College and Hospital	Midnapore	Paschim Medinipur	2004	200	Allopathy
10	College of Medicine & JNM Hospital	Kalyani	Nadia	2009	150	Allopathy
11	College of Medicine & Sagore Dutta Hospital	Kamarhati	North 24 Parganas	2010	150	Allopathy
12	Malda Medical College and Hospital	Malda	Malda	2011	150	Allopathy
13	Murshidabad Medical College and Hospital	Berhampore	Murshidabad	2012	150	Allopathy
14	ESIC Medical College	Joka	Kolkata	2013	125	Allopathy
15	ESIC Medical College and PGIMSR	Maniktala	Kolkata	2013	7 (MD)	Allopathy
16	Maharaja Jitendra Narayan Medical College and Hospital	Coochbehar	Coochbehar	2019	150	Allopathy
17	Diamond Harbour Government Medical College and Hospital	Diamond Harbour	South 24 Parganas	2019	150	Allopathy
18	Raiganj Government Medical College and Hospital	Raiganj	Uttar Dinajpur	2019	150	Allopathy
19	Rampurhat Government Medical College and Hospital	Rampurhat	Birbhum	2019	150	Allopathy
20	Deben Mahata Government Medical College and Hospital	Purulia	Purulia	2020	150	Allopathy
21	Barasat Government Medical College and Hospital	Barasat	North 24 Parganas	2022	150	Allopathy
22	Jalpaiguri Government Medical College and Hospital	Jalpaiguri	Jalpaiguri	2022	150	Allopathy
23	Jhargram Government Medical College and Hospital	Jhargram	Jhargram	2022	150	Allopathy
24	Prafulla Chandra Sen Government Medical College and Hospital	Arambagh	Hooghly	2022	150	Allopathy
25	Sarat Chandra Chattopadhyay Government Medical College and Hospital	Uluberia	Howrah	2022	150	Allopathy
26	Tamralipto Government Medical College and Hospital	Tamluk	Purba Medinipur	2022	150	Allopathy

=== Government Dental Colleges (Allopathy) ===
S. No.	College name	Location	District	Established year	No. of Seats (BDS)	Stream
1	Dr. R. Ahmed Dental College and Hospital	Sealdah	Kolkata	1920	125	Allopathy
2	Burdwan Dental College and Hospital	Burdwan	Purba Bardhaman	2009	125	Allopathy
3	North Bengal Dental College and Hospital	Siliguri	Darjeeling	1990	63	Allopathy

== See also ==
- Education in West Bengal
- Chittaranjan National Cancer Institute
- List of colleges and universities in West Bengal
- List of pharmacy colleges in India
