= National Institute of Technical Teachers' Training and Research, Kolkata =

Deemed University in Kolkata, West Bengal, India

National Institute of Technical Teachers' Training and Research Kolkata
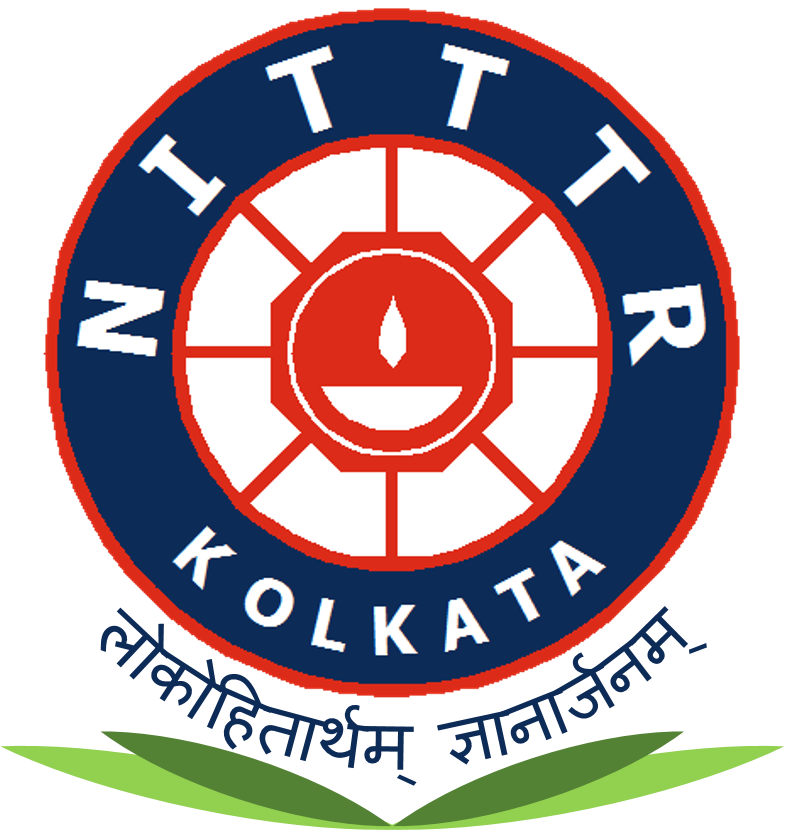
- Motto: lokohitārthama‌ jñānārjanama‌
- Motto in English: Learning for the Benefit of Humanity
- Type: Deemed to be university
- Established: January 11, 1965; 61 years ago
- Academic affiliations: AICTE; AIU
- Chairman: Sajjan Bhajanka
- Director: V. M. S. R. Murthy
- Location: Kolkata, West Bengal, India; 22°34′53″N 88°24′28″E
- Campus: Urban
- Language: English
- Journal: Journal of Engineering, Science & Education
- Website: www.nitttrkol.ac.in

National Institute of Technical Teachers' Training and Research Kolkata, (also known as NITTTR Kolkata) is a Public Deemed university situated in the Kolkata, West Bengal, India.

The institute has established extension centers at Guwahati and Bhubaneswar for reaching out to its clients. The new mandate of the institute has extended its clientele catchment area outside the country encompassing the Technical & Vocational Institutions of particularly SAARC & ASEAN countries.

== History ==
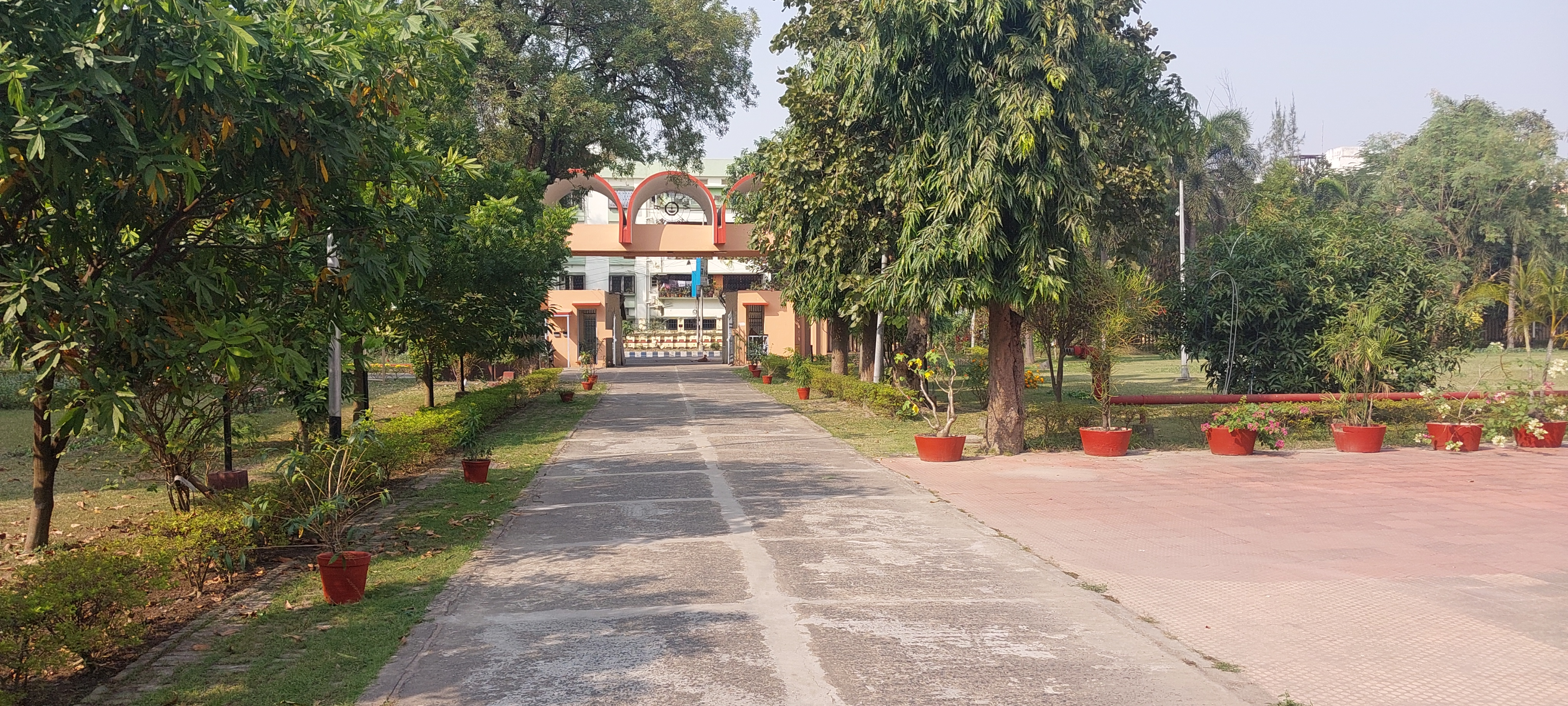
National Institute of Technical Teachers' Training and Research campus in Salt Lake

NITTTR was the first among four such institutes (the other three being at Chandigarh, Bhopal, & Chennai) established by the Department of Education, MHRD, Government of India, as fully centrally funded autonomous institutions for providing pre & in-service training to the teachers and staff of Degree and Diploma level training institutions and also for conducting various activities related to quality improvement of the technical education system of the country. The Government of India, in 2003, accorded national status to this institute, (along with the three sister institutes) in recognition of the contribution of these institutes for the expert service rendered for overall improvement of quality of Technical Education System. NITTTR Kolkata received Deemed-to-be University status under the Distinct Category on March 11, 2024, by the Union Ministry of Education. This status enables the institute to award its own degrees, likely boosting its role in technical teacher education, research, and industry collaboration, aligning with the National Education Policy 2020.

== Academics ==
=== Academic programmes ===
AICTE has recognized the Short-term training programmes conducted by the Institute for consideration for the purpose of movement to higher grades under the Career Advancement Scheme (CAS).

The institute is also offering four AICTE approved, two year (four semester) Post Graduate Degree Programmes in Manufacturing Technology, Multimedia & Software Systems, Mechatronics Engineering and Structural Engineering leading to M.Tech Degree of Maulana Abul Kalam Azad University of Technology (MAKAUT, formally West Bengal University of Technology (WBUT)).

Some of the notable national level projects in which the institute is associated are serving as Nodal agency to centrally sponsored Community Polytechnic Scheme; designing & conducting AICTE sponsored "Induction training Programme" for fresh teachers of engineering colleges and polytechnics; facilitating implementation of Centrally sponsored scheme for Integrating Persons with Disabilities (PWD) in the Mainstream of Technical & Vocational Education etc.

== Extension Centres ==
The institute has established extension centres at Guwahati and Bhubaneswar for reaching out to its clients. This has helped the institute to undertake regular activities of quality improvement (e.g., Training, Curriculum Development, Professional Skill Development, Staff Development Programmes etc.) in a much more effective manner with close interaction with the user systems. The Extension Centres at Guwahati, Assam and Bhubaneswar, Orissa, were established in 1999 and 2000 respectively.

== List of Academic Departments ==
Civil Engineering
Computer Science & Engineering
Education and Management
Electrical Engineering
Mechanical Engineering

== List of Centres and Cells ==
Curriculum Development Centre
Community Development and Rural Technology
Education Technology
Industrial Consultancy & Entrepreneurship Development
Institute of Future Learning
Product Development Cell
Non-conventional Energy Cell
Technology Development Cell
Welding Centre
CAD/CAM Centre
