= Medical association =

Professional organization for medical professionals

A medical association is a trade association that brings together practitioners of a particular geographical area (a country, region, province). In common-law countries, they are often grouped by medical specialties (cardiologists, surgeons, family doctors, etc.).

Medical associations act as a safeguard of the fundamental values of the medical profession: the deontological ethics and code of ethics. In addition to providing exclusive representation in national and international medical practitioners, a medical college is responsible for management and protection of the medical profession.

In most countries, licensing is usually required. A professional or college official is a public corporation of an industry association composed of persons exercising liberal professions and calls are usually covered by the state. Associate members are also known as colleges.

== History ==
In ancient Rome, the college was understood by the name of Colegium the company public law with legal personality, formed by a plurality of persons with the same trade. For its formation is needed at least three people, but to continue their activity sufficient one. It is believed that Opificum o Societate colleges, from which the current Official Colleges, were derived from the associations of commoners to achieve benefits similar to those enjoyed by the patricians, needed a special authorization from the Emperor or the Senate to take legal personality. The government and the administration were chosen at a meeting of all participants. From Alexander Severus, these associations are transformed to free compulsory, children should follow the profession of his father.

These first colleges were characterized by common purpose to prevail over private interests. In Europe, and specifically in Spain, colleges and professional associations have a long tradition through the centuries, interrupted only by the French Revolution, which in its ideology advocating that there should be one between the citizen and the sovereign state. This suppression of the early nineteenth century was changing throughout the century, returning to the end of her rebirth.

Currently, a professional association is a public corporation of an industry association composed of persons exercising professions calls, and are usually covered by the state. Associate members are known as colleges. When dedication is directed to manual or craft activities used the traditional name of guild.

== See also ==
- List of medical organizations
- History of medicine
- Medical royal colleges
