= National Medical Commission =

Regulatory body in the field of medicine in India

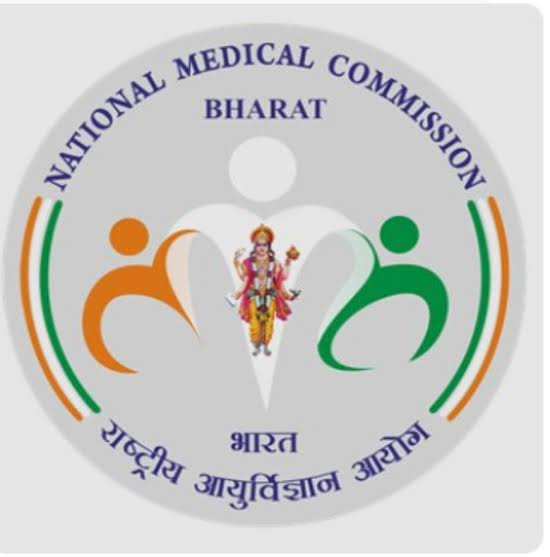
- National Medical Commission
- Abbreviation: NMC
- Predecessor: Medical Council of India
- Formation: 25 September 2020; 6 years ago
- Type: Statutory body
- Legal status: Active
- Headquarters: New Delhi, India
- Chairperson: Dr. Abhijat Chandrakant Sheth
- Main organ: Commission
- Parent organization: Ministry of Health and Family Welfare
- Website: nmc.org.in

The National Medical Commission (NMC) is a statutory body in India that regulates medical education, medical professionals, institutes, and research. The Commission grants recognition of medical qualifications, gives accreditation to medical schools, grants registration to medical practitioners, and monitors medical practice and assesses the medical infrastructure in India.

Established on 25 September 2020, it replaced the Medical Council of India. It was earlier established for 6 months by an ordinance in January 2019 and later became a permanent law passed by Parliament of India and later approved by President of India on 8 August 2019.

== History ==
The NITI Aayog recommended the replacement of Medical Council of India (MCI) with National Medical Commission (NMC). The NMC bill was passed by parliament and approved by President on 8 August 2019.

National Medical Commission ordinance was brought in to replace Medical Council of India in early 2019 through an ordinance issued in January 2019, by the President of India.

The Supreme Court had allowed the Central Government to replace the medical council and with the help of five specialised doctors monitor the medical education system in India, from July 2017.

The planning commission recommended the replacement of Medical Council of India (MCI) with National Medical Commission (NMC). The decision was approved by most states and after its approval by the Prime Minister Narendra Modi it was to be proposed as final bill in the parliamentary sessions by the Minister of health and family welfare Dr. Harsh Vardhan. It was passed by both houses of Parliament in 2019. President of India approved the National Medical Commission Bill 2019 on 8 August 2019 and it became a law.

== Guidelines for foreign medical graduates ==
In 2021, the NMC revised its guidelines for foreign medical graduates (FMGs) seeking to obtain a license to practice medicine in the country. The guidelines introduced changes and updates, including the expansion of recognition of medical qualifications from certain countries and the requirement for FMGs to pass the Screening Test for Foreign Medical Graduates (FMGE).

To be recognised as qualified to practice medicine in India, FMGs must be in possession of a valid medical qualification from a recognised medical institution and to have passed the FMGE, a mandatory examination that measures the knowledge and skills of FMGs in various areas of medicine.

The process for obtaining a license to practice medicine in India under the new guidelines involves several steps, including applying for recognition of the medical qualification with the NMC, registering with the Medical Council of India (MCI), and applying to take the FMGE. Upon passing the FMGE, FMGs can then apply for a license to practice medicine in India with the NMC.

== See also ==
- Central Health Service
- Rehabilitation Council of India
- Dental Council of India
- Indian Nursing Council
- National Commission for Allied and Healthcare Professions
- Pharmacy Council of India
- Medical Council of India
- All India Institute of Medical Sciences
- Indian Council of Medical Research
- Compulsory Rotating Medical Internship
- National Testing Agency
- University Grants Commission
- National Board of Examinations in Medical Sciences
