= Economy of West Bengal =

Emerging Economy In India

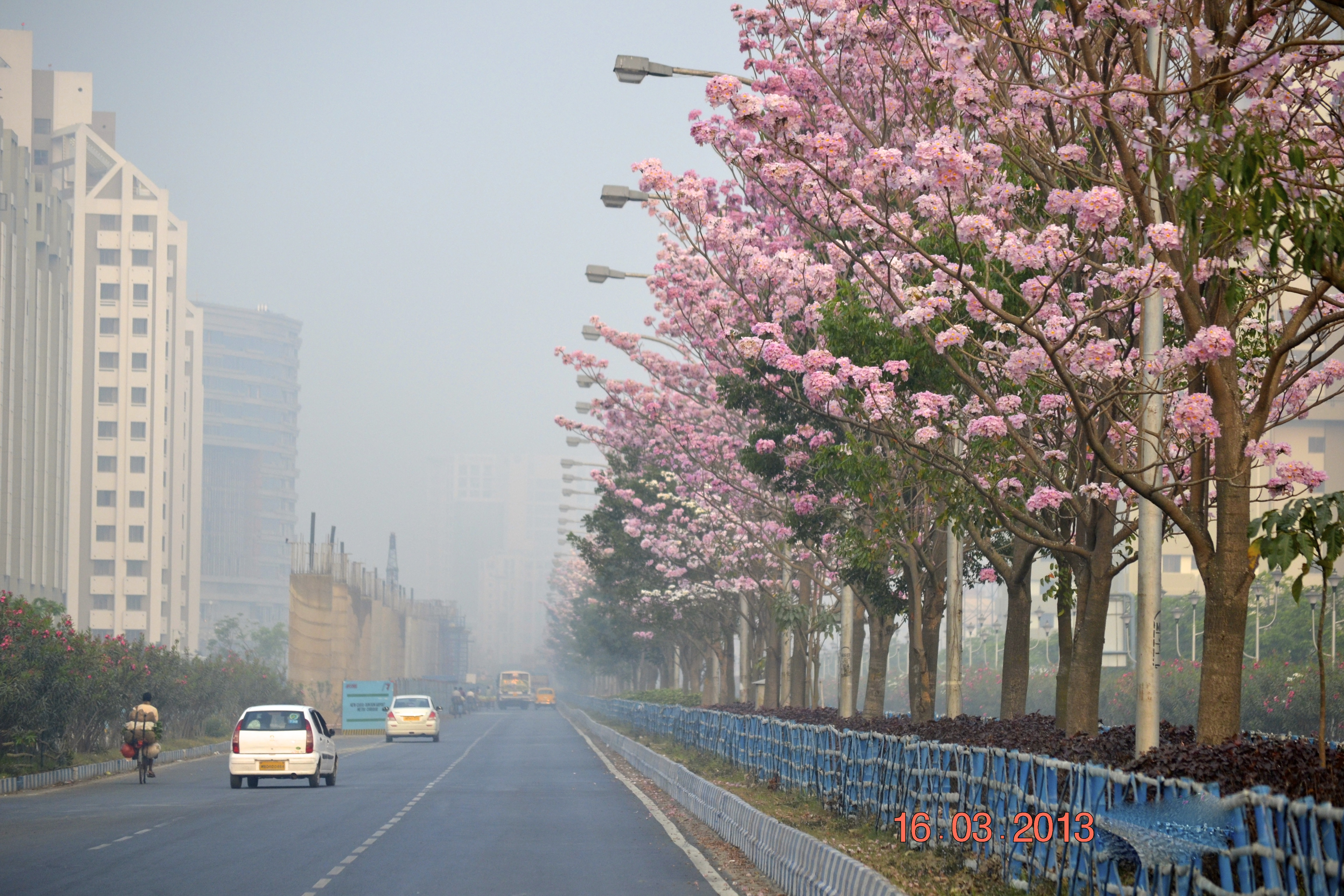
- Kolkata, the financial centre and capital of West Bengal
- Currency: Indian Rupee (INR, ₹)
- Fiscal year: 1 April – 31 March
- Trade organizations: As part of the Union of India, as in G4, G-20, BRICS, WTO, WCO, SAFTA, BIMSTEC, WFTU, BIS, AIIB, ADB and others
- Country group: Developing/emerging; Lower-middle income economy

Statistics
- Population: ▲91,347,736 (2011 census) ▲ ~100.6 million (2026 est.)
- GDP: ▲₹21.48 lakh crore (US$220 billion) (2026-27 FY est.) ▲ ~US$1.073 trillion (PPP)
- GDP rank: 6th
- GDP growth: ▲11.85% (Nominal) (2025-26 FY) ▲8.62% (Real) (2025-2026 FY)
- GDP per capita: ▲~₹198,451 (US$2,100) (2025-26) ▲~US$10,663 (PPP)
- GDP per capita rank: 21st
- GDP by sector: ▼ Agriculture: 17.13% ▲ Industry: 29.77% ▲ Services: 53.10% (2026–27)
- Inflation (CPI): ▼3.63% (June, 2025 FY)
- Population below national poverty line: ▼8.60% 15th in poverty (2022-23)
- Gini coefficient: 0.25 (2023-24) low
- Human Development Index: ▲0.719 (2023) high
- Unemployment: 3.4% (2021-22)
- Main industries: Mining • Steel • IT • Financial services • Manufacturing • Tourism • Chemicals • Leather • Tea • Food processing • Textiles • Cement • Jute • Jewellery • Marine

External
- Exports: ▲₹147,259 crore (US$15 billion) (2025-26 FY) • Software exports : ▲₹40,000 crore (US$4.2 billion) (2025-26) • Merchandise exports : ▲₹107,259 crore (US$11 billion) (2025-26)
- Export goods: IT • metro rolling stock • warships • gold products • tea • iron and steel • precious metals • marine products • rice • textile products • agricultural products • coal • petrochemicals • leather products • jute • heavy machinery
- Main export partners: ASEAN 39%; Bangladesh 17.4%; European Union 13%; USA 12.3%; UAE 9%; Nepal 2.9%; Bhutan 2.6%; and others 3.8%
- FDI stock: ₹13,945.50 crore (US$1.4 billion) (Oct 2019 - Dec 2024)

Public finance
- Government debt: ▼37.98% of GSDP (2026–27 est.)
- Budget balance: ▼₹−74,532 crore (US$−7.7 billion) (3.4% of GSDP) (2026–27 est.)
- Revenue: ▲₹2.88 lakh crore (US$30 billion) (2026–27 est.)
- Spending: ▼₹3.07 lakh crore (US$32 billion) (2026–27 est.)
- All values, unless otherwise stated, are in US dollars.

The economy of West Bengal is a mixed middle-income developing social market economy and the largest Eastern Indian economy with a substantial public sector. It is India's sixth-largest economy by nominal GDP and contributes to about 6.15% of India's total GDP.

West Bengal is the primary business and financial hub of Eastern India. The state is primarily dependent on agriculture and medium-sized industry. West Bengal has jute and tea industry. West Bengal is rich in minerals like coal, limestone, iron ore, copper, lead and zinc.

Since the independence of India, The Green Revolution bypassed the state. However, there has been a significant spurt in food production since the 1980s.

== Agriculture and livestock ==
Contribution of various sectors to GDP (2025-26)
1. Agriculture (17.1%)
2. Industry (29.8%)
3. Services (53.1%)

Agriculture accounts for the largest share of the labour force. It contributed around 17.13% to the gross state domestic product (GSDP) in 2024–25. A plurality of the state's population are peasant farmers.

=== Major produce ===
Rice and potato are considered to be the principal food crops. The state is the largest source of the important food crop of rice, a staple diet across India, with an annual output of around 16.76 million tonnes (about 13% of total production in India) in FY 2021–22, and the second-largest producer of potatoes in India with an average annual output of 12 million tonnes (about 20% of total production in India) in FY 21–22. West Bengal is also the second-largest fish producing state in India after Andhra Pradesh with an annual production of 20.45 lakh tonnes.

Apart from these, jute, sugarcane and wheat are the top crops of the state. Other major food crops include maize, pulses, oil seeds, wheat, barley, and vegetables. Tea is another important cash crop. Darjeeling is globally recognised for tea plantation of the acclaimed Darjeeling tea variety.

Below is a table of 2019 national output share of select agricultural crops and allied segments in West Bengal based on 2011 prices.

Segment	National share %
Jute	88
Betel	75.2
Mesta	40.9
Cauliflower	40.5
Brinjal	33.6
Sweet potato	32.6
Tea	28.9
Cabbage	27
Jackfruit	26.8
Pineapple	25.2
Potato	24.7
Narcotics	24.2
Okra	23.3
Radish	23.2
Inland fish	22.6
Grass pea	21
Litchi	18.7
Sesamum	15.3
Guava	13.7
Masoor	13.1
Sapota	13.1
Paddy	12.4
Papaya	11.9
Egg	11.3
Cashew nut	9.6
Mango	9.2
Tomato	9.1
Meat	9.1
Marine fish	8.9
Water melon	7.9
Green pea	7.2
Chilli	7.2
Cereal	7
Dung	7
Rapeseed and mustard	6.8
Banana	5.9
Straw and stalk	5.4
Ginger	5.3
Kitchen garden	5.3
San hemp	4.5
Garlic	3.4
Moong	2.8

It is also the second largest tea-producing state in India, producing 414.08 million kg of tea in 2022–23, accounting for 30.3% of the country's total tea production. In 2022–23, West Bengal produced approximately 1.48 million tonnes of sugarcane and 3.86 million tonnes of fruits. The state is the largest vegetables producing state in India with 26354.61 thousand MT of production in 2020.

West Bengal accounts for nearly 10% of the country's edible oil production. The state produced a total of 2.045 million tonnes of fish in 2022–23 as compared to 1.84 million tonnes during 2021-22 retaining second spot after Andhra Pradesh in fish production. West Bengal produced around 7649.74 thousand tonnes of milk in FY 23–24.

The state is the largest meat producing state in the country (including poultry), producing 1.293 million tonnes of meat in 2023-24.

== Industry ==
State industries are mostly localised in the cities of Durgapur, Asansol, Howrah, Kharagpur and Haldia region. There are up to 10,000 registered factories in the state and the West Bengal state government has opened Shilpa Sathi (শিল্পসাথী), a single window agency in order to provide investors with all kinds of assistance in establishing and running industrial units.

Kolkata is noted as one of the major centres for industries including the IT industry. The planned cities of Bidhannagar and New Town, Kolkata are major IT hubs of East India. As of April 2019, Sector V of Bidhannagar had approx 1,500 companies. New Town has emerged as the second IT hub of Kolkata after Salt Lake. The growing number of tech parks makes New Town a preferred destination for IT and ITes in East India. Several Information Technology majors are operational like Ericsson, Accenture, Capgemini, Tech Mahindra, ITC Infotech, Mindtree, Adani Labs, British Telecom, TCS, Wipro, Infosys, Cognizant etc. New Town also houses Bengal Silicon Valley Tech Hub.

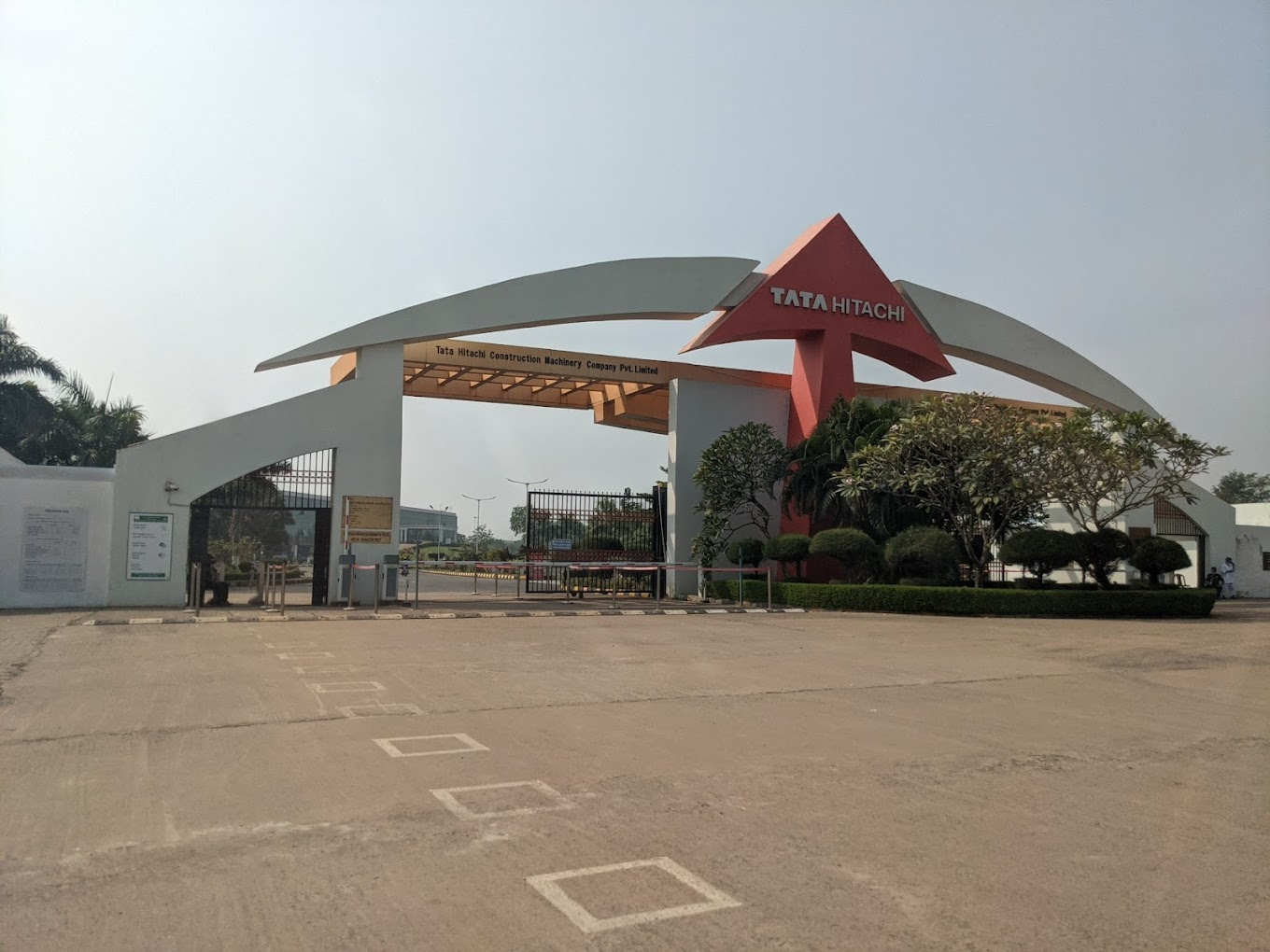
Tata Hitachi plant at Vidyasagar Industrial Park in Kharagpur

Bengal Silicon Valley Tech Hub is an under construction technology hub in the Indian state of West Bengal, consisting of various tech parks, buildings, projects and premises which work on the sectors like IT/ITeS, data centre, E-commerce, IoT, KPO, AI, R&D and Telecom. The hub is projected to be completed in 2025, generating 1,00,000 direct jobs. As of 2022, the total investment in the hub is ₹1 trillion (US$10 billion). It is being built on an area of 250 acres.

FinTech Hub (formerly known as International Financial Hub) is a financial, commercial centre and business district located in New Town. The hub has the presence of a large number of banking, financial companies and legal institutions. Many major companies have their headquarters, offices and training centres operational or under construction. In 2010, inspired by the Bandra Kurla Complex in Mumbai and to turn Kolkata into an international financial centre, the then chief minister of West Bengal Buddhadeb Bhattacharjee and finance minister Asim Dasgupta proposed an International Financial Hub on 100 Acres of land in New Town. The union finance minister of that time, Pranab Mukherjee laid the foundation stone of the project on 13 October 2010. The project had a deadline to be completed in five years. In 2017, the project was relaunched as a FinTech hub. The purpose was to develop financial technology industry in West Bengal. In 2020, 23 financial institutions had their offices setup in the hub. The first 10 acres were identified which was afterwards expanded. On 10 September 2021, HIDCO released an online portal for owing plots easily. Up to September 2021, 48 acres were allotted in 70 acres. As of 2022, 28 financial and legal institutions have their offices in FinTech hub.

MSME contributes to a major portion of the GDP of West Bengal. West Bengal has the second highest MSME units in the country after Uttar Pradesh. According to National Sample Survey Office (NSSO) 73rd round of survey, West Bengal had 88.67 lakh MSME units (14% of total in India).

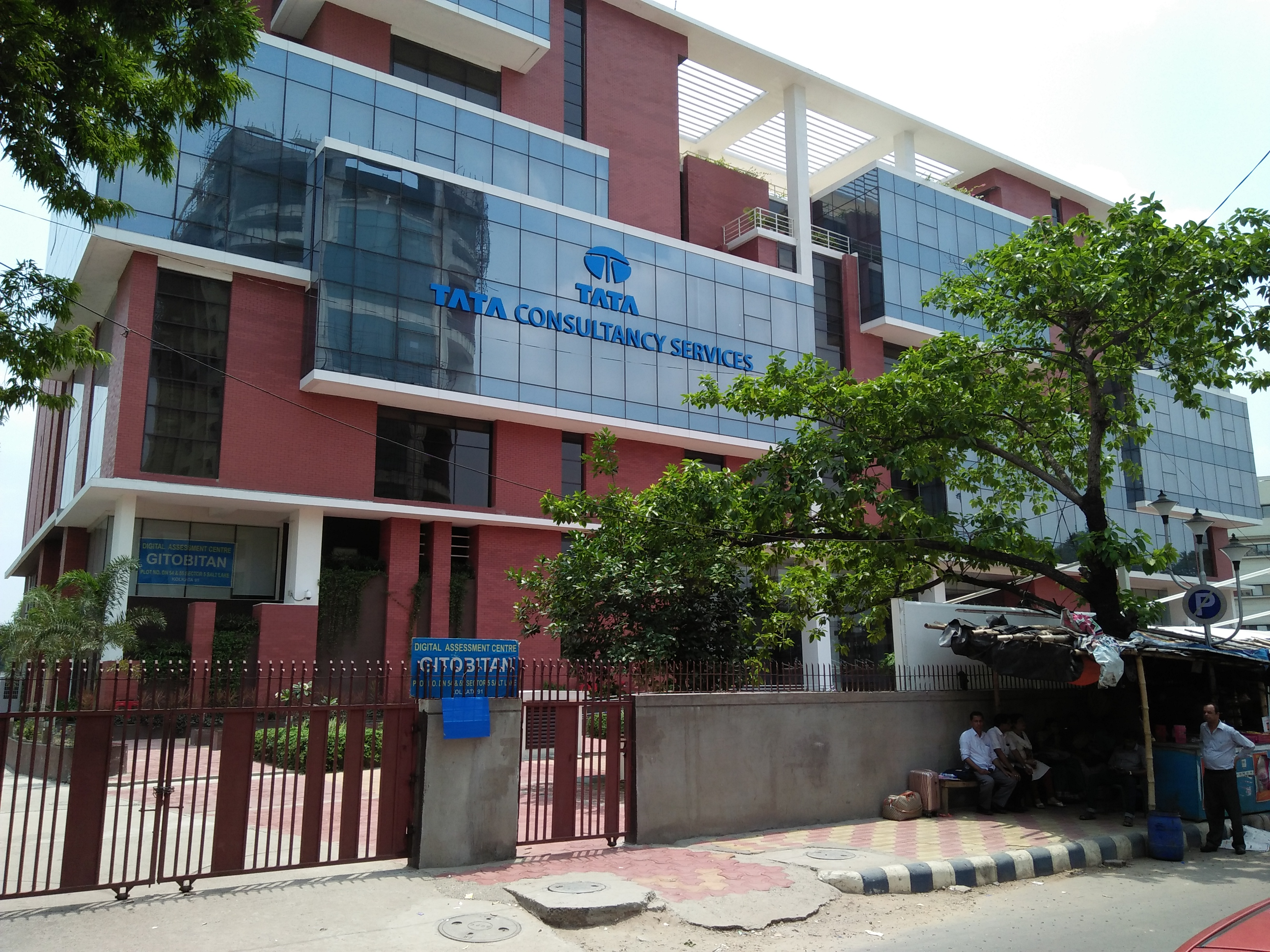
TCS Gitobitan, Salt Lake

There are numerous steel and other heavy engineering plants and production facilities in Durgapur. The centre has established a number of industries in the areas of tea, sugar, chemicals and fertilisers. Natural resources like tea and jute in and nearby parts have made West Bengal a major centre for the jute and tea industries. West Bengal is at the forefront of leather processing and leather goods manufacturing and has around 666 units producing leather and leather related goods. Currently, 22-25% of India's tanning activity is undertaken in Kolkata and its suburbs. Kolkata Leather Complex is a planned leather industrial park at Karaidanga, Bantala near East Kolkata. It is Asia's largest leather complex. Bantala has approximately 500 tanneries. It already has fully operational 500 tanneries and leather goods manufacturing units on 1150 acres of land employing 5 lakh people. The investment has already been to the tune of ₹25,000 crore (US$2.6 billion). In July 2024, it was announced that it will have another 187 tanneries along with 139 footwear units entailing an investment of ₹10,000 crore (US$1.0 billion) and generating employment for 2.5 lakh people.

Kharagpur has also numerous industries of various types such as iron works, cement, chemicals, etc. The state's share of total industrial output in India was 9.8% in 1980–81, declining to 5% by 1997–98. However, the service sector has grown at a rate higher than the national rate.

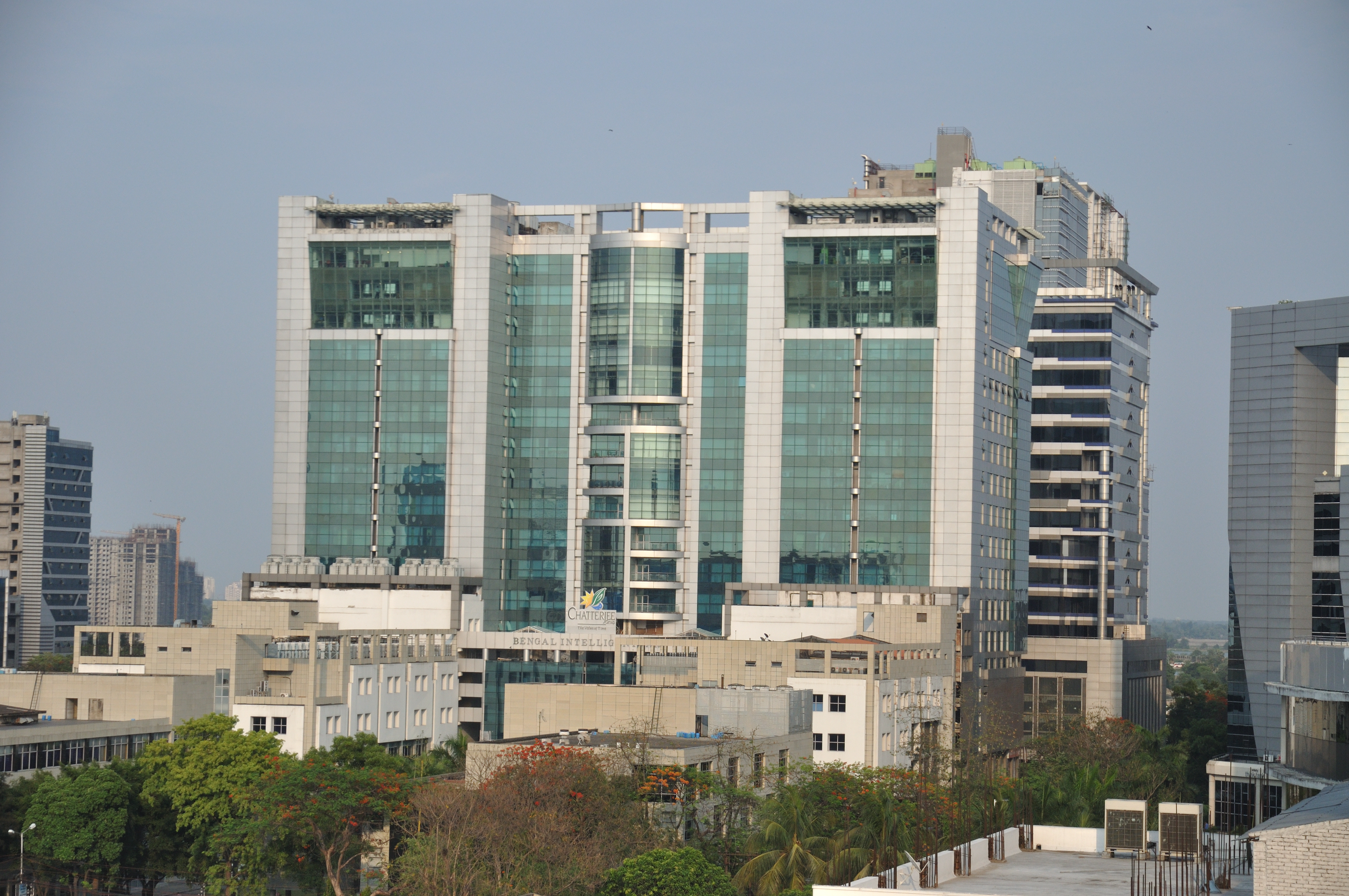
Bengal Intelligent Park, Salt Lake

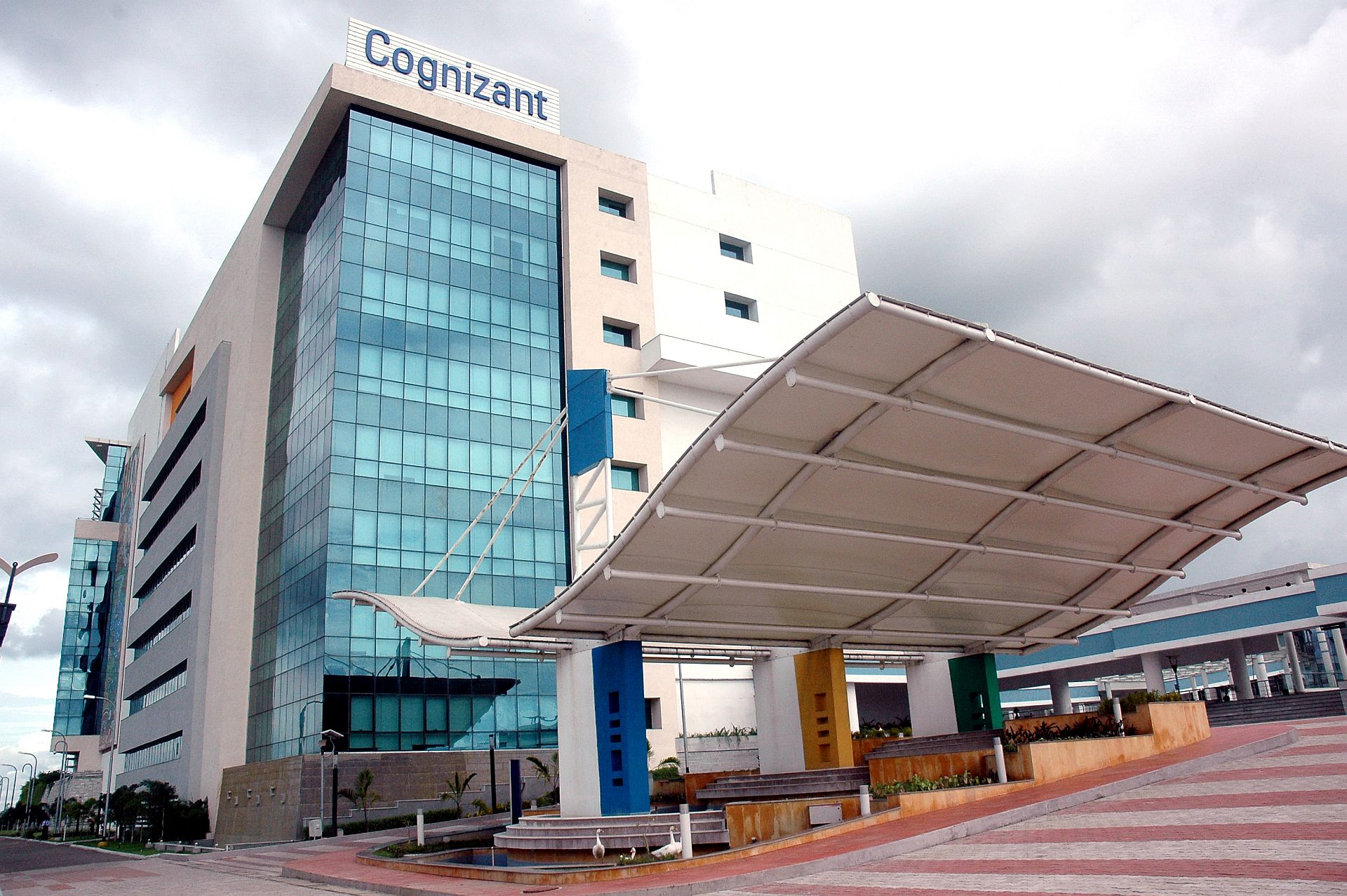
Cognizant, Bantala

Jangal Sundari Karmanagari is an under construction industrial city complex and township in Jangalmahal, Purulia. Jangal Sundari Karmanagari has projected a potential investment of ₹72,000 crore (US$7.5 billion). ₹1,144 crore (US$120 million) has been used for creating basic infrastructures. The industrial city will generate employment for 1.5 lakh people. Major industries include cement, steel, auto component, engineering, MSME clusters, ceramics and electricals.

In Phase I of the project, 1749 acres were allocated and in Phase II, 734 acres were allocated.

Jangal Sundari Karmanagari has received investments from Rashmi Steel (800 acres), Shyam Steel (600 acres), Captain Steel (300 acres), Super Smelter, Maithan Alloys, Vikash Metal and Power Limited. As of March 2023, about 7 thousand people were employed in around 513 acres steel factory, which got an investment of ₹3,220 crore (US$330 million). Shyam Steel is constructing has acquired 600 acres and has started construction (as of March 2023) of a steel plant in 600 acres with an investment of ₹4,591 crore (US$480 million) and expected employment of 10,000 people. A cement factory is under construction in 70 acres with an investment of ₹400 crore (US$42 million).

Chittaranjan Locomotive Works, Titagarh Rail Systems, Texmaco Rail & Engineering and Jupiter Wagons are rolling stock manufacturers located in West Bengal. Titagarh Rail Systems is the second largest freight wagon manufacturer in India. Chittaranjan Locomotive Works is the largest locomotive manufacturer unit in the world, producing 431 locomotives in 2019–20.

The first production unit of Hindustan Cables was set up in 1952 in Rupnarayanpur, in technical collaboration with Standard Telephones and Cables Ltd. for production of paper insulated dry core cables. In 2007 updated and expanded Rupnarayanpur unit, with an installed capacity of 63 LCKM, manufactures polythene insulated jelly filled cables and aerial cables. Facilities for manufacturing 1 million pairs of telephone coiled cords and 1.5 million pieces of computer cords have been set up in the unit. The telephone cords (2 way ovular straight and 4 way ovular extensible etc.) conform to latest specification and cater to Indian market and the computer cords for Computer Industries.

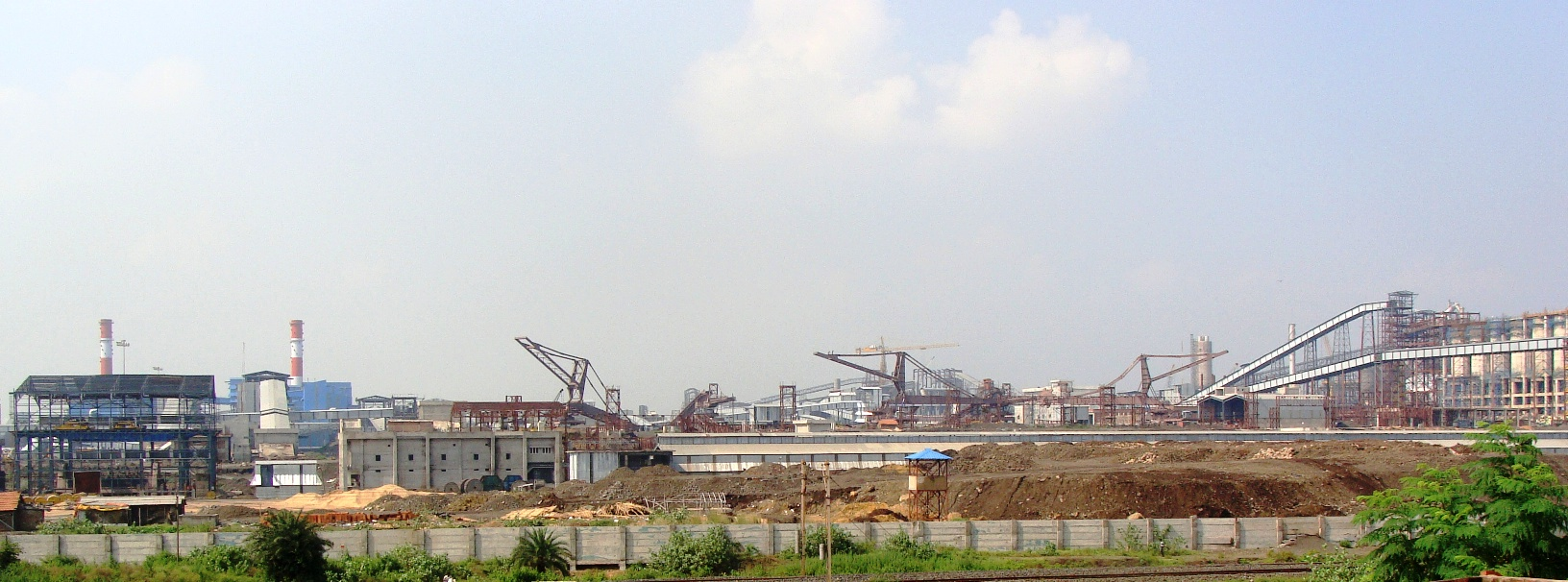
IISCO Steel Plant, Asansol

The Steel Authority of India IISCO (Indian Iron and Steel Company Ltd) steel-making plant at Kulti was the first such facility in India. It became well known during the 1960s and 1970s, with its company shares being traded on the London Stock Exchange. However, a decade later the company became loss-making until it was revived in 2006 when it merged with the Steel Authority of India. Modernisation at IISCO Steel Plant has helped the city develop at a very rapid pace. The plant's capacity will be raised from 0.4 MT to 2.5 MT of saleable steel, using what will be the biggest blast furnace in the country. As of 2015, the investment for modernisation was the single largest investment in West Bengal till then.

The northern districts of Darjeeling, Kalimpong, Jalpaiguri, Alipurduar are famous for growing tea and they are exported world-wide for their supreme taste and quality. Many tea processing units are present here which contribute to the economy of the districts.

=== Semiconductor Fabrication Plant in Kolkata ===
Under a transformative collaboration with the United States, India will get its first-ever national security semiconductor fabrication plant that will produce chips for use in military hardware in both countries as well as in critical telecommunication networks and electronics. The ambitious India-U.S. joint project was announced following talks between PM Narendra Modi and U.S. President Joe Biden in Wilmington on September 21, 2024. The first-ever India-US semiconductor fabrication partnership was described as a "watershed arrangement", according to a joint fact sheet on Modi-Biden talks.

The fab, which will be established with the objective of manufacturing infrared, gallium nitride and silicon carbide semiconductors, will be enabled by support from the India Semiconductor Mission as well as a strategic technology partnership between Bharat Semi, 3rdiTech, and the U.S. Space Force. It will not only become India's first, but one of the world's first multi-material fab for national security. This facility will produce advanced semiconductors for advanced sensing, communication and power electronics, marking the first tech partnership between Indian businesses and the U.S. Space Force, as well as the first of its kind within the Quad group.

GlobalFoundries will set up GF Kolkata Power Center in Kolkata that will enhance mutually beneficial linkages in research and development in chip manufacturing and enable game-changing advances for zero and low emission as well as connected vehicles, internet of things devices, AI, and data centers. The semiconductor fabrication plant will be named "Durga Shakti".

== Industrial parks/areas/towns in West Bengal ==
Name	Area	Location	Industrial Company/ companies	Industry
Panagarh Industrial Park	1458 Acres	Panagarh, Burdwan District	Emami, Valve, Acer, Matix Fertilizers & Chemicals Ltd., H&R Johnson (India), HPCL, Globus Spirit Ltd., IOCL etc.	Cement, chemical fertilizers, Ammonia Plant, Urea Plant, bottling plant, Ceramic Tiles Manufacturing, distillery etc.
Vidyasagar Industrial Park	1167 Acres	Kharagpur, West Medinipur	Tata-Hitachi, Indian Oil Corporation Limited, Orissa Aloy Steel private limited, Godrej Agrovet, Nutricraft India, Mahindra & Mahindra Limited, Megatherm Induction	Machinery, steel, oil
Barzora Industrial Park	432 Acres	Barzora, Bankura District	Anandabazar Patrika, Pratyaha Newspaper, X Pro India, Timespac, Nilkamal Plastics, Surya Alloy Industries, Tulip Fabrics, Steelex Electrocast, HP Ispat, Jain Spun Industries, Maan Concast, Lalwani Industrie, Embee Ferro Alloy, Jai Ambey Metals, Royal Touch Fablon etc.	Steel, plastic, newspaper, fabric, metals etc.
Haldia Industrial Park (WBIDC)	334 Acres	Haldia, East Medinipur	Mitsubishi Chemicals Ltd., South Asian Petrochemicals Ltd, Indian Oil Corporation Limited (IOCL), Exide, Shaw Wallace, Tata Chemicals, Haldia Petrochemicals, Hindustan Lever Limited etc.	Petrochemicals and fertilizers
Haldia Industrial Park (WBIIDC)	120 Acres	Haldia, East Medinipur	Exide, Patanjali Ayurved, PetroCarbon & Chemical Pvt. Ltd., Ralson Petrochemicals Ltd.	Batteries and petrochemicals
Raghunathpur Steel & Allied Industrial Park	1924 Acres	Raghunathpur, Purulia District	Damodar Valley Corporation, Shyam Steel Industries Limited, Shree Cement, DPSC limited	Thermal power, steel, cement
Shalbani Industrial Park	4300 Acres	Salboni, West Medinipur	JSW Group	Cement, paint, steel, solar power unit,
Sankrail Rubber Park	170 Acres	Sankrail, Howrah District	100+ companies	Rubber seeds, footwear, rubber hoses, tubes, micro cellular sheets, chappals, automotive rubber products etc.
Rishi Bankim Silpaudyan	97 Acres	Naihati, North Twenty Four Parganas	Wimplast, Suguna Foods Limited, DTL Ancillary Limited, New Hope Animal Celesty Food Products, Syanchro Pack etc.	Plastics, food processing, etc.
Kharagpur cycle park	20 Acres	Kharagpur, West Medinipur	Unirox, Milan, Luna and Krypton	Cycle production
Kharagpur Industrial Park	257 Acres	Kharagpur, West Medinipur	Tata Iron & Steel Company Ltd., Flender Ltd., Century Extrusions Ltd., Japfa Comfed India Ltd.	Iron and steel, telecom, engineering and food processing
Goaltor Industrial Park	950 Acres	Goaltor, West Medinipur		
Nabadiganta Industrial Township	430 Acres	Bidhannagar, North 24 Parganas	See list of companies having tech park here	IT, ITeS
Budge Budge Garment Park	10 Acres	Budge Budge, South 24 Parganas		Garments and clothing
Paridhan Garment Park	8.78 Acres	Beliaghata, Kolkata	Rupa, Vedanta Fashions, Prapti Fashions, Enfield Apparels, Shipra Commercial, Jagadhatri Trexim, Moustache International, Senorita Creations, Citrus Fashions, Manish Creations, Modern Tradecom, The Rajlakshmi Cotton Mills	Garments and clothing
Shilpangan Light Engineering Park	9.2 Acres	Bidhannagar, North 24 Parganas		Light engineering
West Bengal Hosiery Park	125 Acres	Howrah district		Garments and clothing
Regent Garments and Apparel Park	55 Acres	Barasat, North 24 Parganas		Garments and clothing
EIGMEF Apparel Park	13 Acres	Bidhannagar, North 24 Parganas		Garments and clothing
Kona Integrated Garment Prak	21 Acres	Unsani, Howrah district		Garments and clothing
Sudha Das Food Park, Sankrail	50 Acres	Sankrail, Howrah		Food and processing
Kandua Food Park	54 Acres	Sankrail, Howrah		Food and processing
Sankrail Food Park	34 Acres	Sankrail, Howrah	Amul (world's largest curd manufacturing plant)	Food and processing
Sankrail Poly Park	60 Acres	Sankrail, Howrah	Megaflex Plastics, Elkos Pens, Weilburger Coatings, W.Hunger Hydraulics, Rollx Technologies, Tenty Marketing, Accurate Polymers, Techcon India	Polymer production
Gems & Jewelry Park	6 Acres	Ankurhati, Howrah	Senco Gold Limited, Calcutta Gem & Jewellers Welfare Association, Jain Jewellers	Jewellery production
Haringhata Industrial Park	358 Acres	Nadia	InstaKart Services Pvt. Ltd.	Warehouse, dairy and paper
Kharagpur General Industrial Park	205 Acres	Kharagpur, West Medinipur	Tata Metaliks, Flender McNeil etc.	Metal works
Fulbari Industrial Park	32 Acres	Fulbarigram, Jalpaiguri district		
Dabgram Industrial Park	107 Acres	Dabgram, Jalpaiguri district	Haldia Precision Engineering Pvt. Ltd., M.B. Tea & Allied Products (Pvt) Ltd., Super Treads Pvt. Ltd., Samrat Feed Mills Private Ltd.	Engineering, Cattle & Poultry Feed, Plastic & PVC objects, Food and Tea Processing
Shilpobroto Industrial Park	25 Acres	Binnaguri, Jalpaiguri district		
INDUS Balram Industrial Park		Jalpaiguri district		
Raninagar Industrial Park	152 Acres	Raninagar, Jalpaiguri district	Hindustan Coca-Cola Beverages Pvt. Ltd., Indian Oil Corporation Ltd., Terai Foods Pvt. Ltd., Sona Vets Pvt. Ltd., Amrit Feeds Ltd., JD Industries, Kusum Iron and Steel Ltd., AMD Industries Ltd., Kusum Enterprises	Beverages, Petroleum products, Agro/ Food processing, Plastic products, and Poultry feed
Cooch Behar Industrial Park	98 Acres	Chakchaka, Cooch Behar district	Modern Agrotech Industries, Kamakshi Jute Industries, Sri Balaji Udyog, Hossain Electricals	Agro-based and jute industries, PVC and electrical industries
South City Anmol Infra Park	48 Acres	Howrah district		
Amtala Food Park	125 Acres	Amtala, South 24 Parganas		Food processing units
Regent SME Industrial Park	21 Acres	Ankurhati, Howrah		
Srijan Industrial Logistic Park	24 Acres	Ankurhati, Howrah		
Jalan Complex	2000 Acres	Ankurhati, Howrah	Sharma Gandhi Hire Purchase Ltd., Honey Vanijya Pvt. Ltd., Neptune Hydrocarbons Mfg. Pvt. Ltd., Ugi Engineering Works Pvt. Ltd., R R Proteins & Agro Ltd., Maira Fabricators Pvt. Ltd., J.K. Spices & Food Products, Tridev Engineering Pvt. Ltd., Ganesh Grains Ltd. and many more	Mixed use
Amta Industrial Park	1200 Acres	Amta, Howrah		
Uluberia Industrial Park (WBIDC)	129 Acres	Uluberia, Howrah	M & M Machine Craft Pvt. Ltd., ITC, Varun Tea Plantation Ltd., Flipkart	Mixed use
Uluberia Industrial Park (WBIIDC)	160 Acres	Uluberia, Howrah	CERATIZIT India Pvt. Ltd., Saj Industries Pvt . Ltd., Sintex Industries Ltd., Goel Alloy & Steel Pvt. Ltd.	Iron & Steel Products, Food processing, Plastic & PVC molding units
Ranihati Foundry Park	924 Acres	Sankrail, Howrah	Nif Ispat Ltd., RRL Steels Ltd., Bhajjanka Ispat Pvt. Ltd., Pacheria Castings Pvt. Ltd., Dinesh Brothers Pvt. Ltd., Yashi Castings	Iron & Steel Products
Dankuni Industrial Park	777 Acres	Dankuni, Hooghly		
Bagnan Industrial Park	23 Acres	Bagnan, Howrah		
Shaktigarh Industrial Park	3.1 Acres	Saktigarh, Bardhaman		Electronic goods

== Infrastructure ==
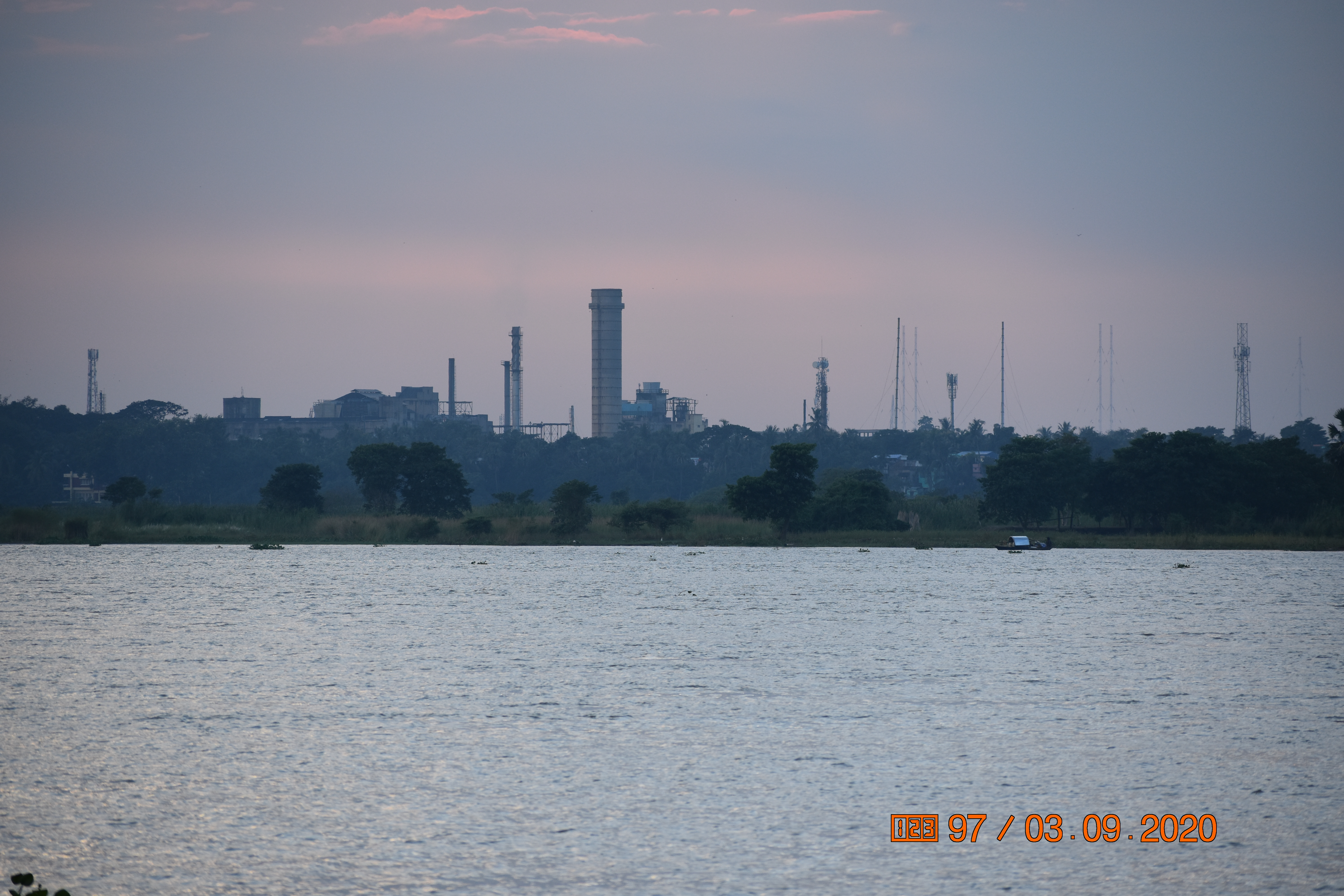
Bandel Thermal Power Station

=== Power and energy ===
As of end of August 2024, according to data released by Central Electricity Authority, the installed power capacity of the state is 15553.03 MW, compared to 450 GW of the country. Of the total installed power capacity, 13,567 MW was contributed by thermal power, 1,986.03 MW was contributed by hydro power and renewable power together. West Bengal government's ministry of power, in its report, enumerates individual power generating stations in West Bengal along with their respective locations and generating capacities while mentioning the total installed capacity as 9,805 MW as of January 2021. As of 2024, 100% of households were fully electrified.

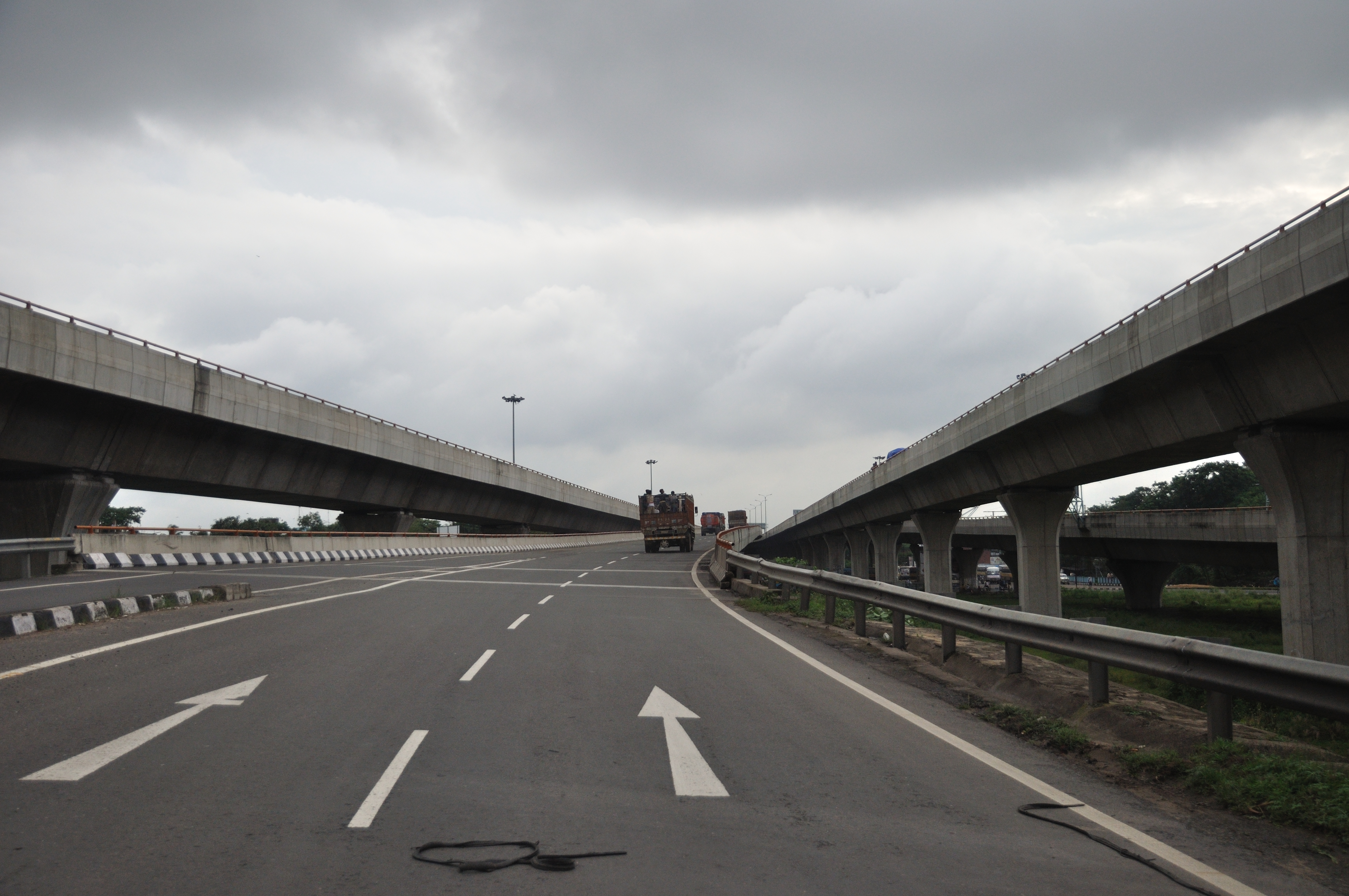
Belghoria Expressway

=== Communication and transportation ===
As of 2018, West Bengal has a total road length of 283,865 kilometres (176,386 mi), with a road density of 1.04 km per km^{2}. Of this, national highways constitute 3,674 kilometres (2,283 mi) and state highways 3,612 kilometres (2,244 mi). As of June 2015, the central government mulled augmenting the state's national highways' length by another couple of thousand kilometres in a bid to supplement to India's plan of seamless BBIN connectivity through Nepal, Bhutan, India, and Bangladesh, subject to availability of land, by investing in the tunes of US$4–5 billion.

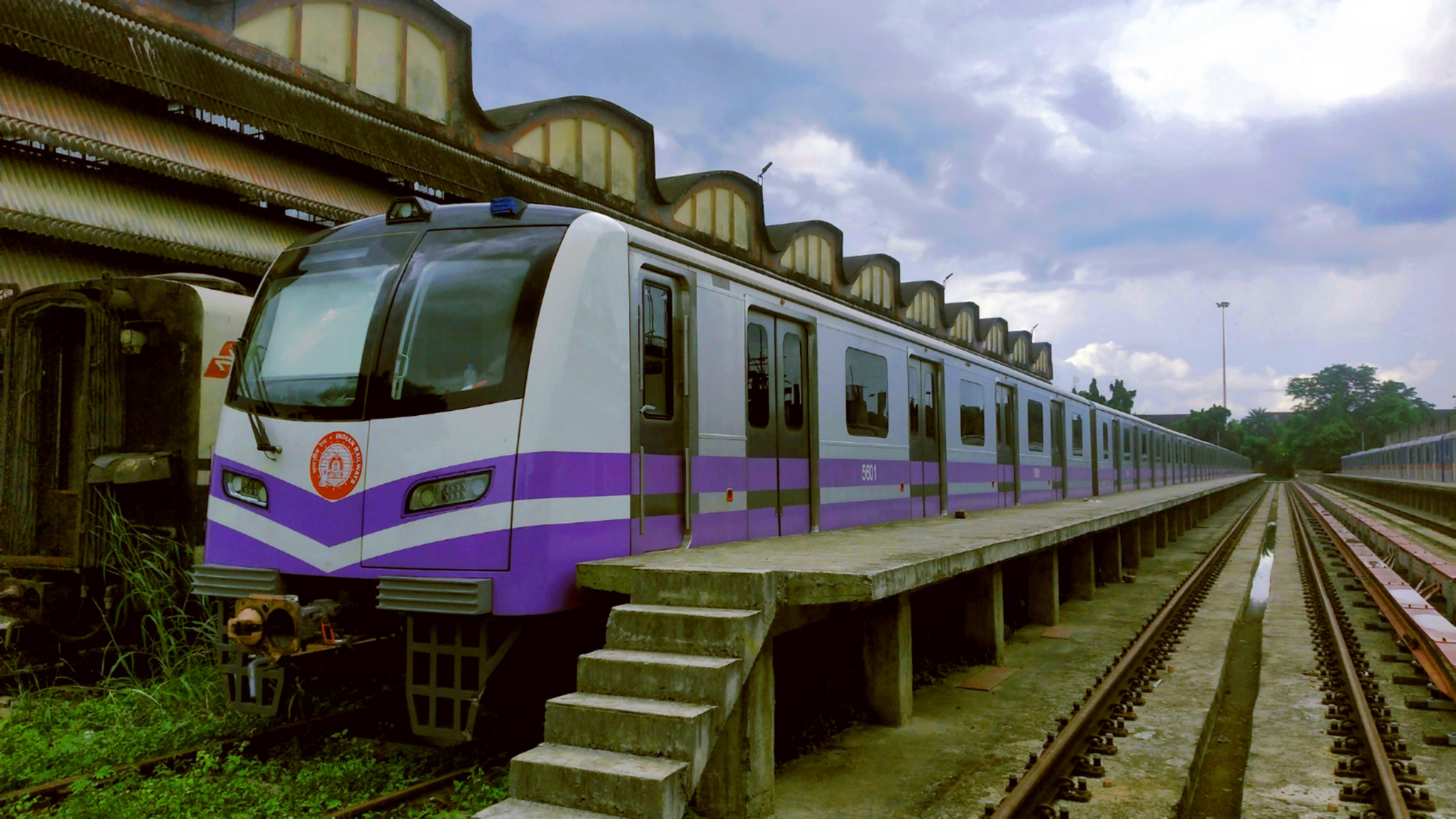
Kolkata Metro CRRC Dalian rake

=== Railways ===
The Eastern Railway zone, South Eastern Railway zone and Northeast Frontier Railway zone of Indian Railways run operations in West Bengal. At the end of 2023–24, the route length in West Bengal was 4,203 km of which around 4,016 km has been converted to broad gauge and around 3,906 km has been electrified, the running track length was 7,122 km and the total track length was 10,466 km, with the number of stations exceeding 800. Kolkata Metro railway is the newest zone of the IR with four operational lines of total length of about 60 km. As of 2024, various other metro links of approximately 74 km route length are underway in different phases of construction in Kolkata.

=== Ports ===
Kolkata is a major river-port in eastern India. The Kolkata Port Trust manages both the Kolkata docks and the Haldia docks. There is passenger service to Port Blair on the Andaman and Nicobar Islands and cargo ship service to ports in India and abroad, operated by the Shipping Corporation of India. Kolkata Port handled 65.660 million tonnes (mt) of traffic in 2022–23, around 12.86% higher vis-a-vis that handled during previous fiscal. Kolkata Dock System, the first major dock formally commissioned in 1870, handled cargo traffic of 17.052 mt in 2022–23, registering a significant growth of 11.46% over the previous year. Haldia Dock Complex, the 1st green port of the country in 2015, handled 48.608 mt in 2022–23, recording growth of 11.8% over the last year. During 2022–23, 6,75,904 Container TEUs were handled at the Port vis-à-vis 7,35,195 TEUs during 2021–22. Total containerised tonnage handled at SMP, Kolkata was 10.59 million tonnes in 2022-23 vis-à-vis 11.8 million tonnes in 2021–22. Kolkata Dock System handled 5,68,722 TEUs in 2022-23 compared to 5,69,783 TEUs in 2021–22, recording a marginal decline. In 2019-20 Kolkata Dock System achieved the highest ever container throughput of 6,75,439 TEUs. Haldia Dock Complex handled 1,07,182 TEUs in 2022-23 vis-a-vis 1,65,412 TEUs in 2021–22.

Kolkata Port ranked 1st in terms of coking coal & other coal handling amongst major ports of India.

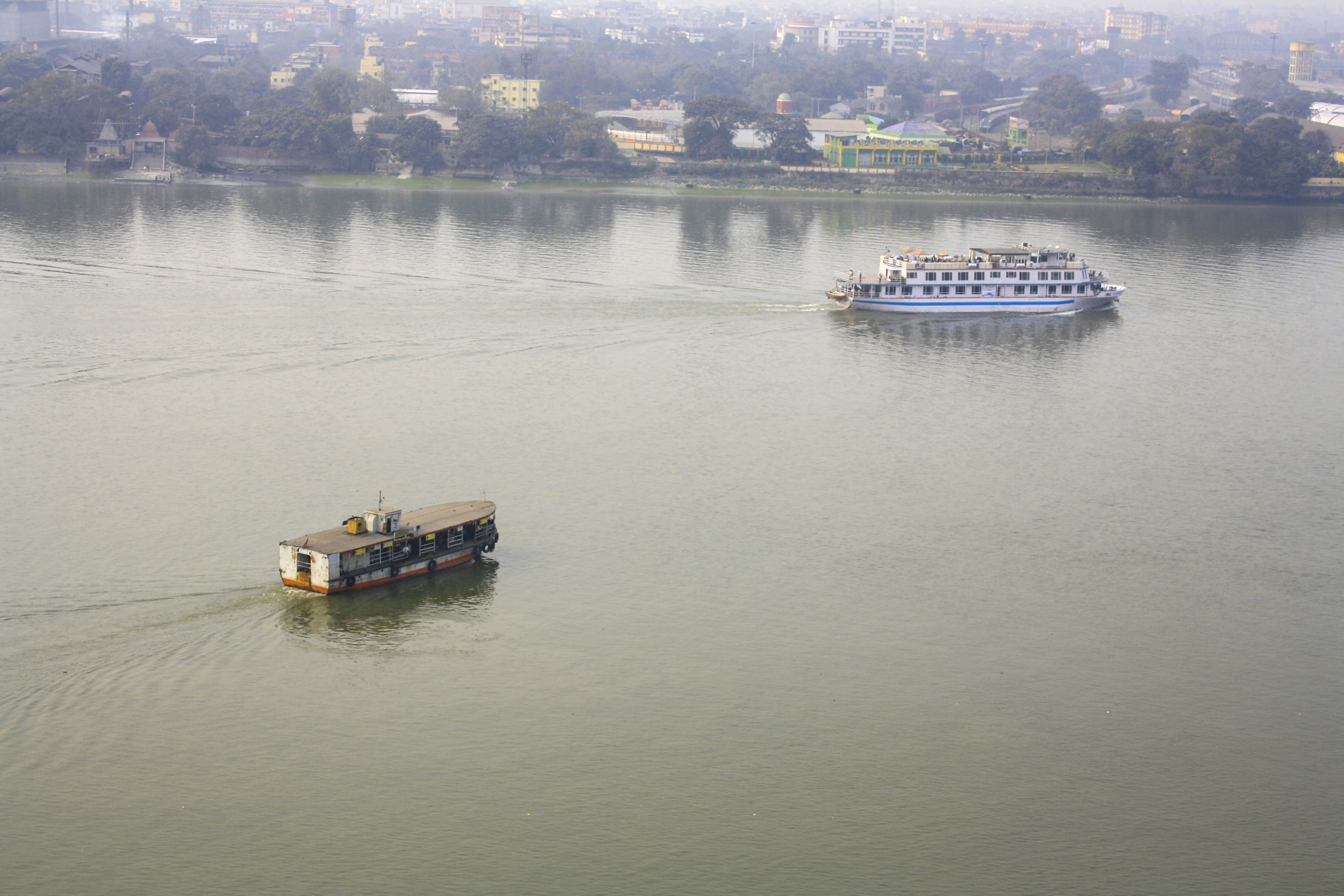
Ferries on Hooghly River

=== Inland waterways ===
The 560 km long Haldia-Farakka stretch in West Bengal is part of the stretch of Ganges between Haldia and Prayagraj declared as the National Waterway 1. Also a 91 km long stretch of the National Waterway 5 is within West Bengal. West Bengal government has sought to build infrastructure to begin sustained fuel efficient cost efficient and eco-friendly shipping operations for cargo transportation and tourism, passenger traffic as well along 12 rivers in West Bengal which can reduce congestion on roads. These rivers that has been identified for national waterways services, are the Prayagraj-Haldia stretch of the Ganga Bhagirathi Hooghly river, Ajay River (96 km), Mayurakshi River (110 km), Damodar River (135 km), DVC canal (130 km), Dwarakeswar River (113 km), Ichamati River (634 km), Jalangi River (131 km), Rupnarayan River (72 km), Subarnarekha River (314 km) and Sunderban Waterways (201 km).

=== Telecommunications ===
As of end of June 2024, as per statistics published in press release of TRAI, there were 81.353 million wire-less (mobile phone) subscriptions (including 23.215 million with 89.47% VLR or active connections in Kolkata service area and 58.138 million with 97.61% VLR or active connections in rest of West Bengal service area) compared to over 1170.5 million wire-less connections in the whole country with VLR or active connections of 90.75% and 1.596 million wire-line subscriptions (including 1.04 million in Kolkata and 0.556 million in rest of West Bengal) in West Bengal (with a total state-level tele-density of 82.27% as of 30 June 2024) compared to over 35.107 million wire-line connections in the whole country (with nationwide total tele-density of 85.95%) while as of April 2016 the number of broadband subscriptions in the state were arbitrarily estimated to be around 11 million compared to that of whole of India with over 151.09 million broadband connections. VSNL has its international gateway and earth station in Kolkata. International connectivity is provided through VSNL and five STPI (Software Technology Parks of India) earth stations in Kolkata, Durgapur, Kharagpur, Haldia and siliguri. Digha has been selected as the cable landing station for the submarine cable laying project connecting India and South East Asia. BSNL has an optical fiber network of 15000 km route in West Bengal. Reliance group's Jio Infocomm has laid 4500 km of optical fiber network in the state for its 4G network. Under National Optic Fibre Network (NOFN) mission, optical fibre cable will be laid in 341 blocks covering most of the gram panchayats in West Bengal.

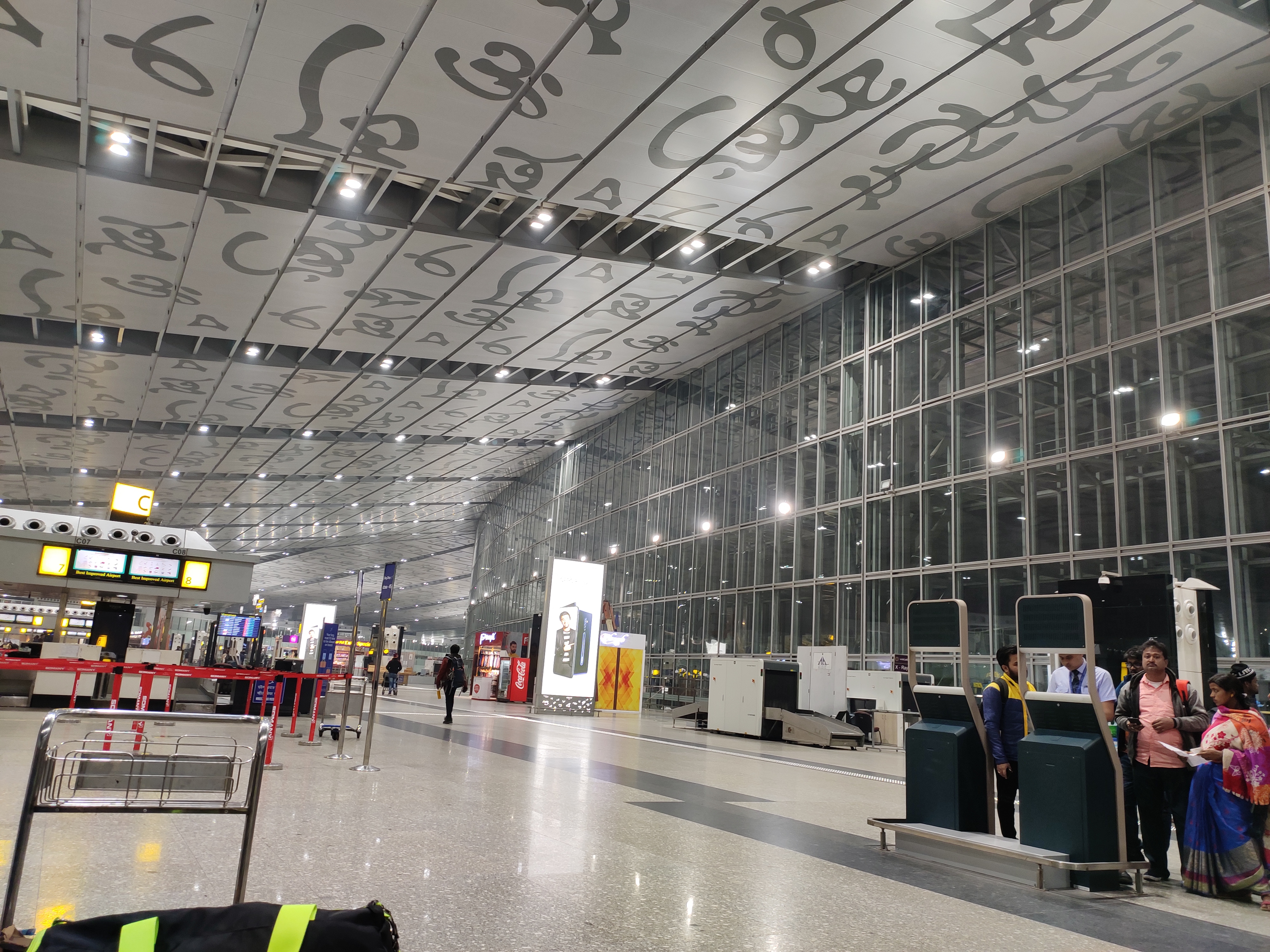
Inside Netaji Subhas Chandra Bose International Airport

=== Aviation ===
Spread over 2640 acres at Dum Dum in Kolkata, the largest in eastern India, the newly modernised Netaji Subhas Chandra Bose International Airport is the sixth busiest international airport in India in respect of aircraft movement (after Delhi, Mumbai, Bangalore, Hyderabad and Chennai). It has two asphalt runways, the primary one extended by 700 meters (3627 × 46m) and upgraded to CATIIIB, and the secondary one (3190 × 46m) upgraded to CATII ILS standards. Its terminal is a new and sprawling L-shaped six-level integrated terminal of over 2,510,000 sq ft inaugurated in 2013, able to handle 25 million passengers per annum. It includes check-in counters that use CUTE (Common User Terminal Equipment) technology, 78 immigration counters, 12 customs counters, passenger lounges provided by Air India and Jet Airways, 18 aerobridges, 57 remote parking bays, 2 underground two-leveled carparks and car parking facilities in landscaped area capable of handling 5000 cars. The airport has a Centre for Perishable Commodities (CPC), two luxury hotels and a shopping mall.

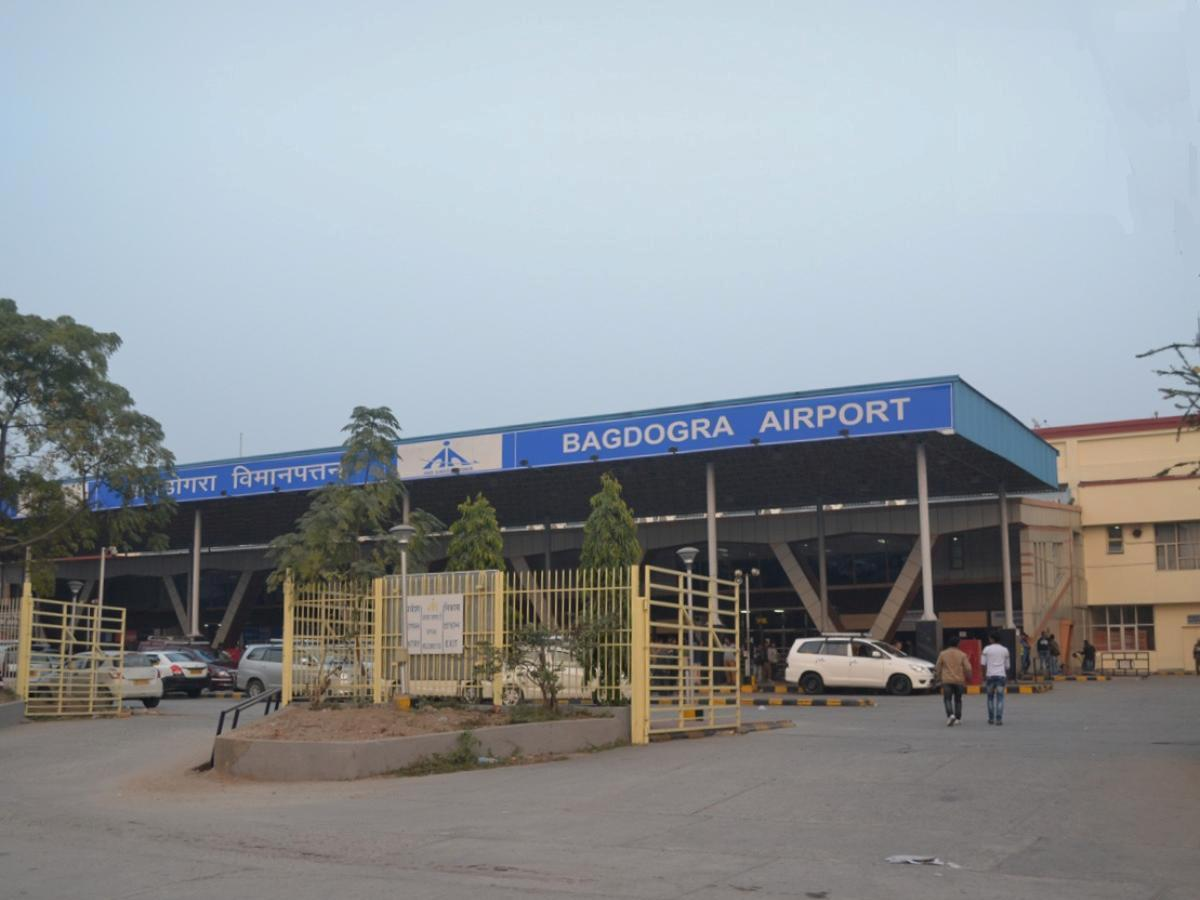
Bagdogra Airport

In the fiscal year April 2023 to March 2024, the airport handled 1,40,879 aircraft movements including 20,078 international aircraft movements, 19.784 million passengers (including 2.4 million international passengers and 17.31 million domestic passengers), 1,51,626 metric tonnes of freight. Between the 1940s and 1960s, major airlines such as Aeroflot, Air France, Alitalia, Cathay Pacific, Japan Airlines, Philippine Airlines, KLM, Pan Am, Lufthansa, Swissair and SAS operated from the airport. With the advent of longer haul aircraft and the socio-economio-political degeneration of the state during the 1960s, several airlines gradually discontinued operations there. The withdrawal of Lufthansa's service to Frankfurt in 2012 left Kolkata with no direct flights beyond Asia. Kolkata airport is to undergo the execution of Phase 2 of the expansion plan which primarily involves the construction of an 86-meter ATC Tower. Additionally, the current Kolkata Metro expansion plans include two new lines to the airport for better connectivity.

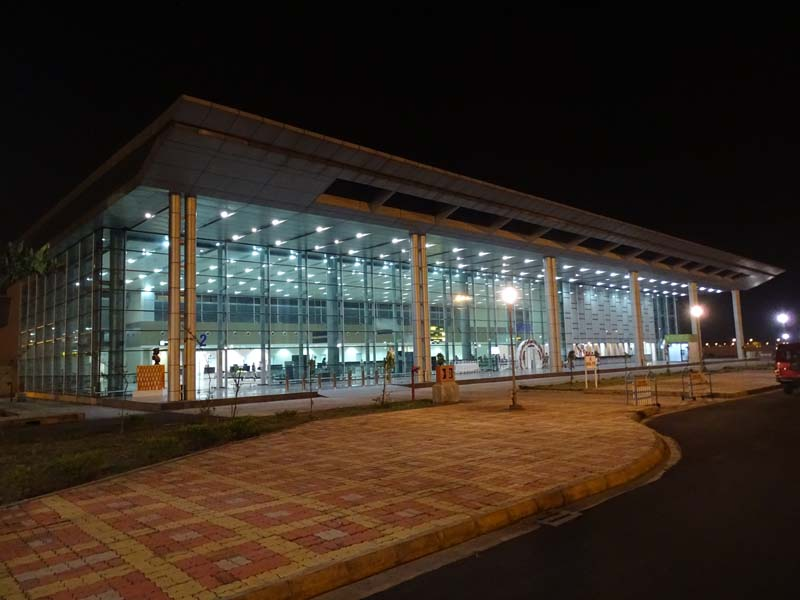
Kazi Nazrul Islam Airport, Durgapur

Bagdogra International Airport, Siliguri is another significant airport in the state. It serves as the gateway to North-east India and countries like Bhutan, Nepal and Bangladesh. In the fiscal year April 2023 to March 2024, the airport handled 20,838 aircraft movements including 434 international aircraft movements, 3.12 million passengers (including 21,137 international passengers and 3.09 million domestic passengers), 8,445 metric tonnes of freight.

Kazi Nazrul Islam Airport, Durgapur country's first private greenfield aerotropolis project spread over 650 acres, under Bengal Aerotropolis Projects Limited (BAPL) co-owned by Singapore-based Changi group, conceived in 2006–07 to be a domestic/international airport with handling capacity of 1 million per annum that can be expanded to 2.5 million per annum in future, officially commenced operations in 2015 at Andal, Durgapur 185 km away from the state capital Kolkata. Currently it has direct flight connections to major cities like Bangalore, Bhubaneswar, Chennai, Delhi, Guwahati, Hyderabad, Mumbai and Siliguri. In the fiscal year April 2023 to March 2024, the airport handled 3,234 aircraft movements, 0.51 million passengers, 491 metric tonnes of freight.

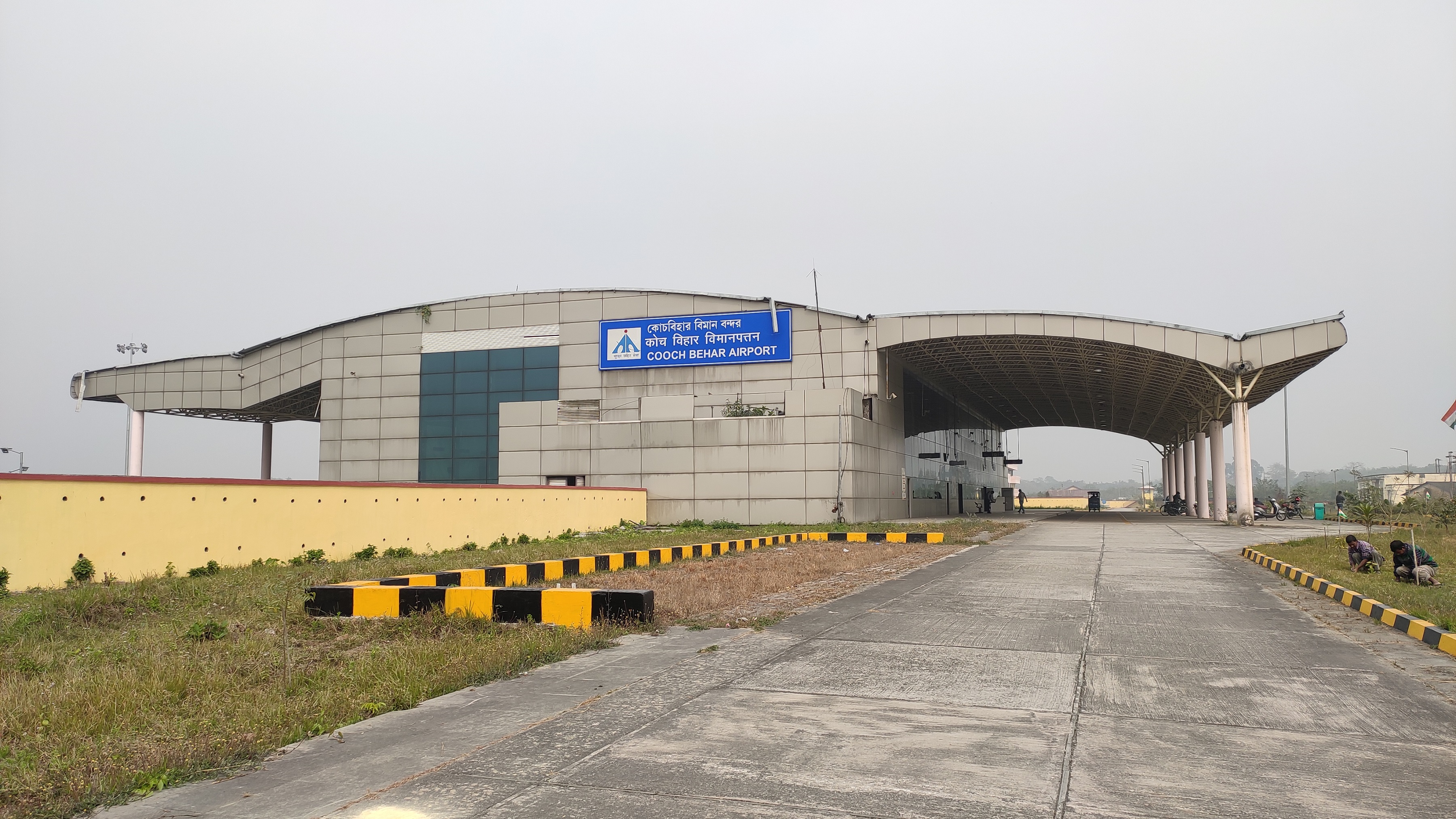
Cooch Behar Airport Terminal

Cooch Behar Airport is a domestic airport serving the city of Cooch Behar and parts of North Bengal and Assam. It is located 6.2 km (3.9 mi) from the city centre. The airport is spread over an area of 173 acres. The airport is located at an elevation of 141 feet (43 m) above mean sea level. It has one runway designated 04/22 with an asphalt surface, measuring 3,507 by 100 feet (1,069 by 30 m) without an instrument landing system. The airport can handle only flights using visual flight rules during the day. Improvements in radar as well as other runway systems have been completed, such as installation of lights on the runway, while the instrument landing system will be installed in the near future. There is presently a high security team residing in the airport which uses a non-directional beacon for navigation services. Commercial services resumed from Cooch Behar with IndiaOne Air starting flights to Kolkata on 21 February 2023. In the fiscal year April 2023 to March 2024, the airport handled 568 aircraft movements, and 4,384 passengers.

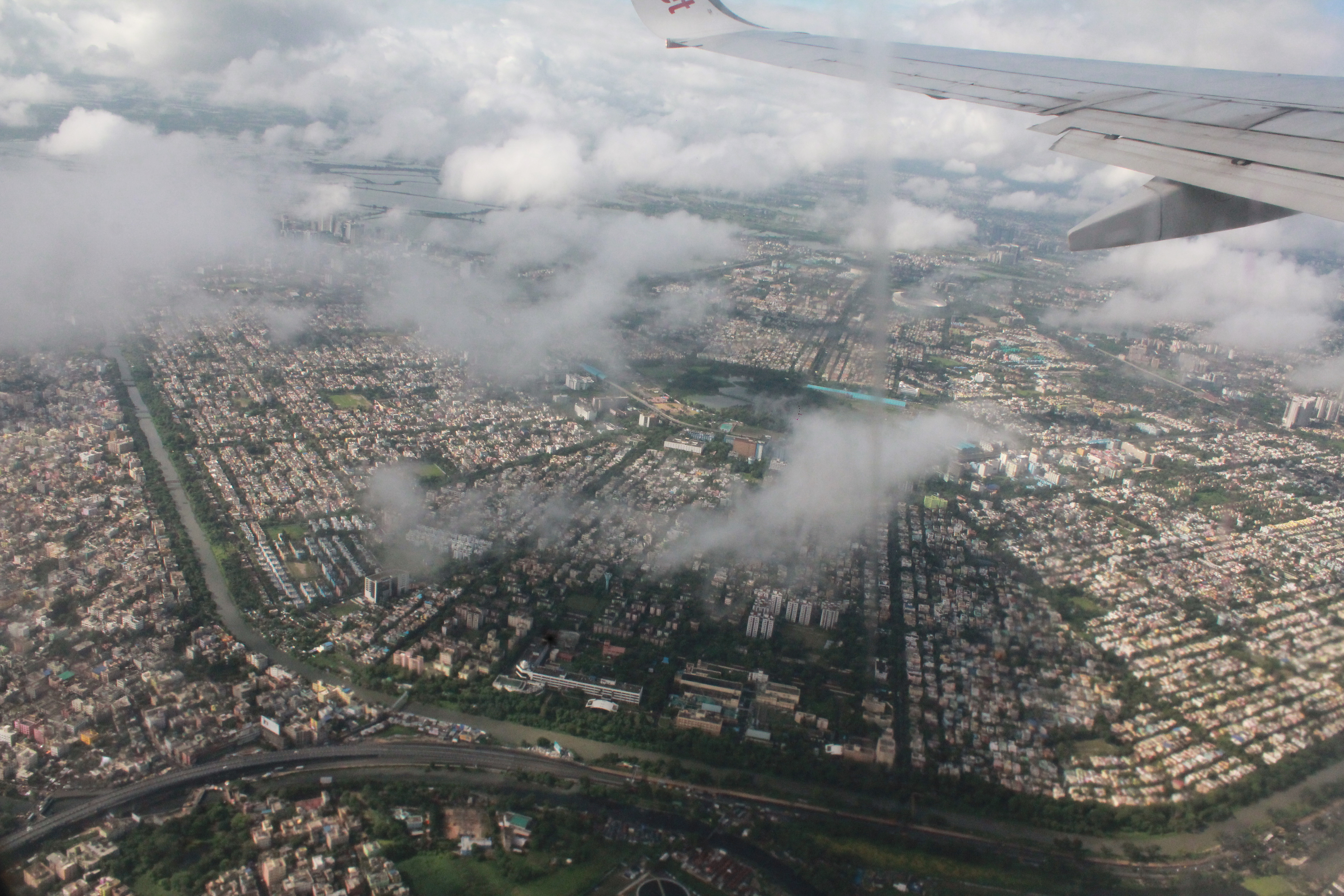
Aerial View of Salt Lake, Kolkata

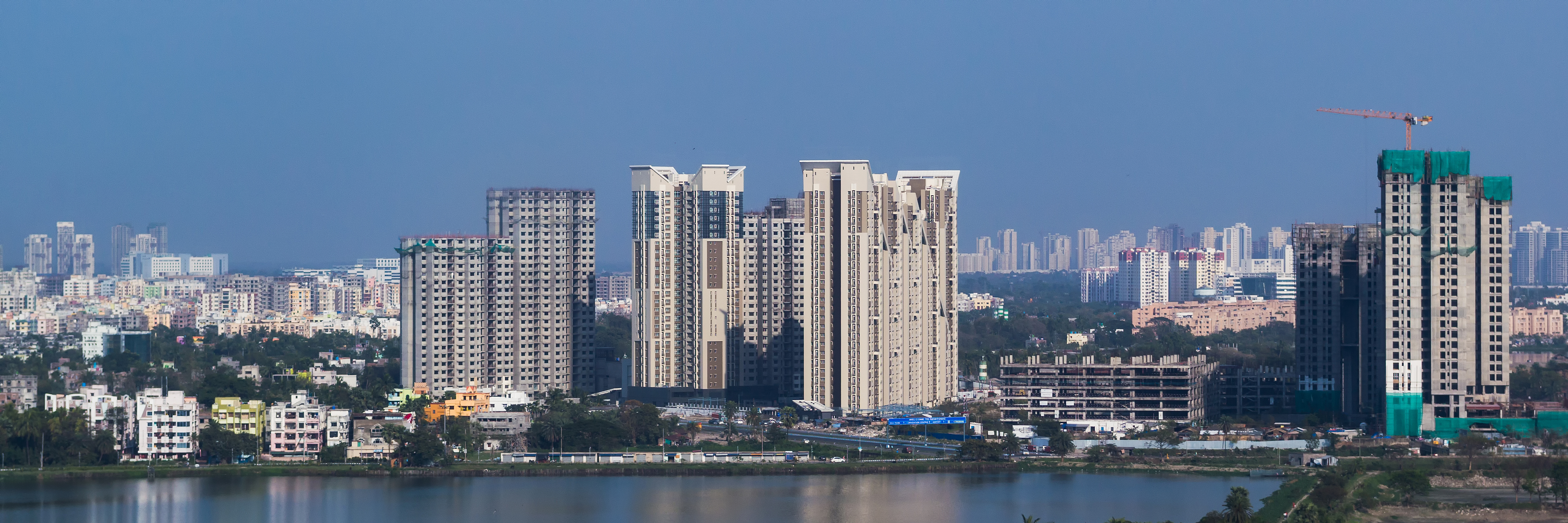
New Town Skyline

=== Industry ===
As of 2011, the state has 22 formally approved special economic zones (SEZ). Of these, 17 are related to information technology (IT) or IT, enabled services (ITES).

== Economic indices ==
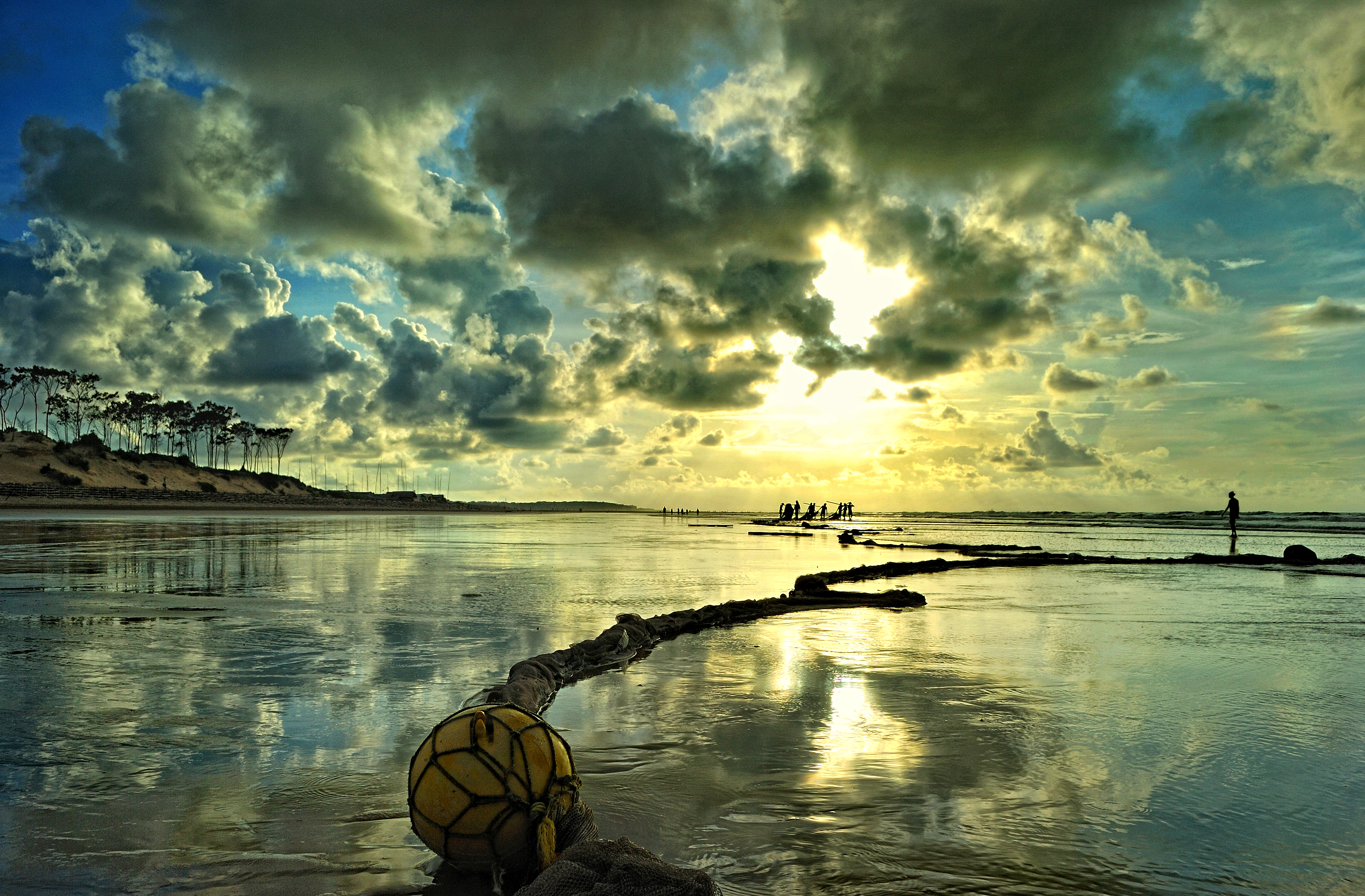
Economic production - beach net fishing at Digha Beach

As per the state budget presented in the state legislative assembly on 12 February 2025, West Bengal's nominal GSDP at current prices has risen to ₹20.3 lakh crore (US$210 billion) in the year 2025–26, the average INR to US$ exchange rate in that year being INR 88. West Bengal's per capita nominal GSDP at current prices for the economic year 2023-24 is ₹171,184 (US$1,800). In the year 2024–25, it is expected to grow to ₹188,467 (US$2,000).

In terms of nominal net state domestic product (NSDP) at factor cost at current prices (base year 2011–2012), West Bengal was the sixth largest economy in India, with an NSDP of ₹18.8 lakh crore (US$200 billion) in 2024-25 and in terms of nominal gross state domestic product (GSDP) at current prices, the state had GSDP of ₹13.97 lakh crore (US$150 billion) in the economic year 2022–23 as mentioned by Reserve Bank of India. In 2023–24, the tertiary sector of the economy (service industries) was the largest contributor to the gross domestic product of the state, contributing 54.13% of the state domestic product compared to 18% from primary sector (agriculture, forestry, mining) and 27.87% from secondary sector (industrial and manufacturing). At a compound annual growth rate of 15.2%, the tertiary sector has been the fastest growing among the three sectors from 2004–05 to 2009–10. The growth has been driven by trade, hotels, real estate, finance, insurance, transport, communications and other services.

The state's total financial debt that stood at ₹1,918 billion (US$20 billion) as of 2011 swelled to ₹3,050 billion (US$32 billion) at the end of 2015-16 and is estimated to further grow to ₹6,932 billion (US$72 billion) at the end of 2024–25, although as a percentage of GSDP it is expected to decrease to about 36.88%.

GSDP growth from 1980–81 to 2024-25
Year	GSDP (in current prices)	Growth Rate
1980-81	₹10,345 crore (US$1.1 billion)	
1981-82	₹11,575 crore (US$1.2 billion)	11.89% ▲
1982-83	₹13,049 crore (US$1.4 billion)	12.73% ▲
1983-84	₹15,302 crore (US$1.6 billion)	17.27% ▲
1984-85	₹17,676 crore (US$1.8 billion)	15.51% ▲
1985-86	₹19,032 crore (US$2.0 billion)	7.67% ▲
1986-87	₹20,803 crore (US$2.2 billion)	9.31% ▲
1987-88	₹25,077 crore (US$2.6 billion)	20.55% ▲
1988-89	₹27,106 crore (US$2.8 billion)	8.09% ▲
1989-90	₹30,623 crore (US$3.2 billion)	12.97% ▲
1990-91	₹34,797 crore (US$3.6 billion)	13.63% ▲
1991-92	₹40,380 crore (US$4.2 billion)	16.04% ▲
1992-93	₹43,290 crore (US$4.5 billion)	7.21% ▲
1993-94	₹53,424 crore (US$5.5 billion)	23.41% ▲
1994-95	₹62,031 crore (US$6.4 billion)	16.11% ▲
1995-96	₹73,864 crore (US$7.7 billion)	19.08% ▲
1996-97	₹82,075 crore (US$8.5 billion)	11.12% ▲
1997-98	₹97,966 crore (US$10 billion)	19.36% ▲
1998-99	₹115,516 crore (US$12 billion)	17.91% ▲
1999-00	₹135,376 crore (US$14 billion)	17.19% ▲
2000-01	₹143,724 crore (US$15 billion)	6.17% ▲
2001-02	₹157,144 crore (US$16 billion)	9.34% ▲
2002-03	₹168,000 crore (US$17 billion)	6.91% ▲
2003-04	₹189,258 crore (US$20 billion)	12.65% ▲
2004-05	₹208,656 crore (US$22 billion)	10.25% ▲
2005-06	₹230,254 crore (US$24 billion)	10.35% ▲
2006-07	₹261,681 crore (US$27 billion)	13.65% ▲
2007-08	₹299,482 crore (US$31 billion)	14.45% ▲
2008-09	₹341,942 crore (US$36 billion)	14.18% ▲
2009-10	₹398,880 crore (US$41 billion)	16.65% ▲
2010-11	₹460,959 crore (US$48 billion)	15.56% ▲
2011-12	₹520,485 crore (US$54 billion)	11.43% ▲
2012-13	₹591,464 crore (US$61 billion)	13.63% ▲
2013-14	₹676,848 crore (US$70 billion)	14.43% ▲
2014-15	₹718,081 crore (US$75 billion)	6.09% ▲
2015-16	₹797,299 crore (US$83 billion)	11.03% ▲
2016-17	₹872,527 crore (US$91 billion)	9.43% ▲
2017-18	₹974,700 crore (US$100 billion)	11.71% ▲
2018-19	₹1,102,053 crore (US$110 billion)	13.06% ▲
2019-20	₹1,179,097 crore (US$120 billion)	7% ▲
2020-21	₹1,155,820 crore (US$120 billion)	-1.97% ▼
2021-22	₹1,363,925 crore (US$140 billion)	17% ▲
2022-23	₹1,515,564 crore (US$160 billion)	13% ▲
2023-24	₹1,651,374 crore (US$170 billion)	11% ▲
2024-25	₹1,812,372 crore (US$190 billion)	10% ▲
2025-26 (RE)	₹1,990,896 crore (US$210 billion)	10% ▲
2026-27(BE)	₹2,178,244 crore (US$230 billion)	9% ▲

== Per capita income ==
In the year 2022–23, the per capita income of West Bengal was calculated to be ₹141,373 (US$1,500) at current prices. It is expected to grow to about ₹203,095 (US$2,100) in the year 2025–26 by extrapolating the values according to GSDP growth rate. The latest district-wise values of per capita income available was of 2013–14. They are shown as below and their values extrapolated to 2022-23 and 2024-25 values respectively.

District	Per capita income (2013–14)	Per capita income (2022–23)	Per capita income (2025–26)
Bankura	₹ 57,879	₹ 1,16,796	₹ 1,64,109
Birbhum	₹ 53,122	₹ 1,07,197	₹ 1,50,478
Coochbehar	₹ 54,069	₹ 1,09,108	₹ 1,53,152
Dakshin Dinajpur	₹ 50,991	₹ 1,02,897	₹ 1,44,440
Darjeeling	₹ 87,695	₹ 1,76,961	₹ 2,48,407
Howrah	₹ 70,350	₹ 1,41,961	₹ 1,99,276
Hooghly	₹ 70,102	₹ 1,41,461	₹ 1,98,574
Jalpaiguri	₹ 59,652	₹ 1,20,373	₹ 1,68,972
Kolkata	₹ 1,12,737	₹ 2,27,494	₹ 3,19,342
Malda	₹ 50,942	₹ 1,02,797	₹ 1,44,300
Murshidabad	₹ 50,186	₹ 1,01,271	₹ 1,42,158
Nadia	₹ 58,870	₹ 1,18,795	₹ 1,66,757
North 24 Parganas	₹ 66,384	₹ 1,33,958	₹ 1,88,042
Paschim Bardhaman	₹ 81,607	₹ 1,64,676	₹ 2,19,533
Purba Bardhaman
Paschim Medinipur	₹ 57,952	₹ 1,16,942	₹ 1,55,898
Purba Medinipur	₹ 87,082	₹ 1,75,725	₹ 2,46,672
Purulia	₹ 50,074	₹ 1,01,046	₹ 1,41,842
South 24 Parganas	₹ 56,983	₹ 1,14,988	₹ 1,61,413
Uttar Dinajpur	₹ 39,720	₹ 80,152	₹ 1,12,512
West Bengal	₹ 70,059	₹ 1,41,373	₹ 1,98,451

== Multidimensional poverty ==
According to a report released by NITI Aayog in 2023 on Multidimensional Poverty Index, West Bengal had a poverty rate of 11.89% as compared to 14.96% at national level in the years 2019–21. It further decreased to 8.60% in 2022-23 (projected) as compared to 11.28% at national level. Several socialist schemes have helped to reduce poverty and maintain equality of income in the state. The district-wise values of multidimensional poverty is as follows-

Multidimensional Poverty Headcount (district-wise)
District	Poverty Headcount (2015–16)	Poverty Headcount (2019–21)	Poverty Headcount (2022–23) (Projected)
Bankura	26.99%	▼18.49%	▼13.37%
Birbhum	27.35%	▼18.27%	▼13.21%
Coochbehar	21.90%	▼10.31%	▼7.46%
Dakshin Dinajpur	22.48%	▼13.37%	▼9.67%
Darjeeling	11.32%	▼5.45%	▼3.94%
Howrah	12.84%	▼6.06%	▼4.38%
Hooghly	14.93%	▼7.36%	▼5.32%
Jalpaiguri	21.83%	▼8.85%	▼6.40%
Kolkata	2.72%	▼2.56%	▼1.85%
Malda	34.48%	▼15.57%	▼11.26%
Murshidabad	27.23%	▼16.55%	▼11.97%
Nadia	11.07%	▼8.20%	▼5.93%
North 24 Parganas	9.80%	▼4.37%	▼3.16%
Paschim Bardhaman	20.33%	▼11.20%	▼8.10%
Purba Bardhaman	20.33%	▼14.32%	▼10.36%
Paschim Medinipur	23.82%	▼18.14%	▼13.12%
Purba Medinipur	14.19%	▼12.48%	▼9.03%
Purulia	49.69%	▼26.84%	▼19.41%
South 24 Parganas	28.10%	▼10.96%	▼7.93%
Uttar Dinajpur	42.84%	▼21.65%	▼15.66%
West Bengal	21.29%	▼11.89%	▼8.60%

== Foreign direct investment ==
Under the overall guidance and policies of the government of India, the West Bengal government welcomes foreign technology and investments as may be appropriate for the needs of the state and is mutually advantageous. Foreign direct investment has mostly come in the manufacturing and telecommunication sectors. According to the Department for Promotion of Industry and Internal Trade, Government of India, West Bengal attracted a cumulative FDI investment of ₹13,346.32 crores (US$1,723 million) from October 2019 to September 2024.

== Exports ==
West Bengal is one of the country's leading exporters of finished leather goods. In 2023–24, the state accounted for around 6% of the country's exports of leather and leather products. The state accounted for around 70% of India's dried flower exports in 2008–09. The state is also a leading exporter of shrimps and tea.

However, the rapid industrialisation process has given rise to debate over land acquisition for industry in this agrarian state. NASSCOM–Gartner ranks West Bengal power infrastructure the best in the country.

Export Goods from West Bengal (2023–24)
Commodity group	Total Exports Apr'23 - Mar'24 ($ million)	% share of total exports	Total Exports Apr'24 - Dec'24 ($ million)	% share of total exports
Engineering Goods	3,134.81	26.83%	2,292.48	28.29%
Gems and Jewellery	1,485.27	12.71%	1,277.46	13.94%
Leather and Leather Manufactures	696.33	5.96%	530.03	5.78%
Organic and Inorganic Chemicals	577.6	4.94%	512.04	5.59%
Petroleum Products	560.61	4.80%	469.57	5.12%
Marine Products	513.12	4.39%	434.35	4.74%
Electronic Goods	470.84	4.03%	263.58	2.88%
Rice	432.59	3.70%	433.56	4.73%
Plastic and Linoleum	357.05	3.06%	248.25	2.71%
Ready-made garments of all textiles	321.05	2.75%	227.58	2.48%
Cereal preparations and misc. processed items	262.78	2.25%	134.28	1.47%
Jute Manufacturing including floor covering	229.45	1.96%	194.90	2.13%
Tea	198.99	1.70%	177.67	1.94%
Cotton Yarn/Fabrics/Madeups, Handloom products, etc.	174.02	1.49%	144.21	1.57%
Iron Ore	166.83	1.43%	2.51	0.03%
Mica, coal and other ores, minerals including process	154.56	1.32%	110.45	1.21%
Man-Made yarn/fabrics/madeups etc.	121.69	1.04%	65.36	0.71%
Total	11,684.64	2.67%	9,164.00	3.20%

The district-wise export data is also available from the Ministry of Commerce and Industry dashboard.

District-wise Exports from West Bengal
District	Total Exports (Apr'23 - Mar'24)
Alipurduar	₹1,420.36 crore (US$150 million)
Bankura	₹754.24 crore (US$78 million)
Birbhum	₹959.89 crore (US$100 million)
Coochbehar	₹154.08 crore (US$16 million)
Dakshin Dinajpur	₹259.02 crore (US$27 million)
Darjeeling	₹1,238.11 crore (US$130 million)
Howrah	₹11,108.81 crore (US$1.2 billion)
Hooghly	₹4,089.29 crore (US$420 million)
Jalpaiguri	₹2,888.71 crore (US$300 million)
Jhargram	₹123.36 crore (US$13 million)
Kalimpong	₹7.70 crore (US$800,000)
Kolkata	₹38,917.16 crore (US$4.0 billion)
Malda	₹730.93 crore (US$76 million)
Murshidabad	₹1,023.83 crore (US$110 million)
Nadia	₹267.94 crore (US$28 million)
North 24 Parganas	₹4,178.81 crore (US$430 million)
Paschim Bardhaman	₹7,104.05 crore (US$740 million)
Purba Bardhaman	₹3,229.17 crore (US$340 million)
Paschim Medinipur	₹2,708.51 crore (US$280 million)
Purba Medinipur	₹10,313.39 crore (US$1.1 billion)
Purulia	₹965.41 crore (US$100 million)
South 24 Parganas	₹3,068.24 crore (US$320 million)
Uttar Dinajpur	₹1,227.92 crore (US$130 million)
West Bengal	₹102,556 crore (US$11 billion)

== Sustainable Development Goals ==
NITI Aayog releases Sustainable Development Goals reports at regular intervals. The first report was released in 2018 where West Bengal had a composite score of 56 as compared to 57 of India. The next report was released in 2019-20 where West Bengal had a composite score of 60 which was the same at the national level. In the third edition of the report released in 2020–21, West Bengal scored 62 while the national average rose to 66. In the latest edition of the report during 2023-24 released on 12 July 2024, West Bengal saw a massive improvement of composite score to 70 putting it in the front-runner category while the national average rose to 71. The goal-wise scores of West Bengal over the years is given below:

Year-wise Sustainable Development Goal Scores
No.	SDG Goals	2018	2019-20	2020-21	2023-24
1	No Poverty	57	▼52	▲59	▲63
2	Zero Hunger	50	▼40	▲46	▲56
3	Good Health and Well-being	66	▲70	▲76	▲79
4	Quality Education	51	▼50	▲54	▲60
5	Gender Equality	40	▼38	▲41	▲45
6	Clean Water and Sanitation	54	▲83	▼81	▲86
7	Affordable and Clean Energy	40	▲58	▲98	▲100
8	Decent Work and Economic Growth	63	▲72	▼57	▲63
9	Industry, Innovation and Infrastructure	45	▲68	▼53	▲66
10	Reduced Inequality	76	▼73	▼71	▼70
11	Sustainable Cities and Communities	25	▲34	▲45	▲54
12	Responsible Consumption and Production	-	57	▲79	▲94
13	Climate Action	-	37	▲39	▲44
14	Life Below Water	-	43	▲50	▲100
15	Life on Land	88	88	▼53	▲91
16	Peace, Justice and Strong Institutions	72	▲73	▲81	▲82
	Composite	56	▲60	▲62	▲70

== See also ==
Kulti - the pioneer in large scale industrialisation in India.
