= Nistarini Women's College =

College in West Bengal, India

- Type: Undergraduate and post-graduate college
- Established: 17 August 1957; 69 years ago
- Affiliations: Sidho Kanho Birsha University
- Location: Deshbandhu Rd, Purulia, West Bengal, 723101, India; 23.3433277°N 86.365997°E
- Campus: Urban
- Website: Nistarini Women's College

- Location within West Bengal Location within India

Nistarini Women's College is a girls-only govt. aided college located in Purulia district, West Bengal, India. It was established on 17 August 1957 and is the oldest women's college in the district. It offers both undergraduate and postgraduate courses in arts and sciences. It is affiliated to Sidho Kanho Birsha University and accredited by the National Assessment and Accreditation Council (NAAC) with an A grade.

== History ==
Amala Devi, the daughter of Bhuban Mohan Das and Nistarini Devi, and the sister of Chittaranjan Das, established a school for girls in Purulia in 1902. It was named Nistarini Vidyalaya and it provided education in various subjects including literature, music and arts. An orphanage and a home for widows were also operated under Amala Devi's supervision.

Following the deaths of Bhuban Mohan Das, Nistarini Devi and Amala Devi, the school, orphanage and widow home were temporarily closed. The school was later revived by Basanti Devi, the wife of Chittaranjan Das. During this period, attention was also given to the education of children from the local Harijan community.

The establishment of a women's college in Purulia was subsequently supported by Bidhan Chandra Roy, then Chief Minister of West Bengal, local leaders and social workers including Jimut Bahan Sen. Nistarini Women's College began functioning on 17 August 1957 from a rented building known as "Swapan Puri" on Ranchi Road. On 16 April 1958, the college moved to the summer house of Chittaranjan Das. On 6 November 1958, Rajendra Prasad, then President of India, laid the foundation stone of the college's main academic building.

== Affiliation and accreditation ==
The college is affiliated to Sidho Kanho Birsha University and recognized by the University Grants Commission (UGC). It was accredited by the National Assessment and Accreditation Council (NAAC) and awarded an A grade in 2016.

== Departments ==
=== Science ===
- Chemistry
- Physics
- Mathematics
- Botany
- Zoology
- Nutrition
- Computer Science
- Environmental Science

=== Arts ===
- Music
- Economics
- Physical Education
- Santhali
- Bengali
- English
- Sanskrit
- Hindi
- History
- Geography
- Political Science
- Philosophy
- Education

== Student union ==
In December 2016, the college held its student-union election. The Democratic Students' Organisation (DSO) won 21 of the 22 seats. The organisation had previously won the student union at the college on several occasions.

== Controversy ==
In September 2024, a professor of Nistarini Women's College was arrested due to an allegation of sexual misconduct with a first-semester geography student. A case was registered under the Protection of Children from Sexual Offences (POCSO) Act.

== See also ==
- List of institutions of higher education in West Bengal
- Education in India
- Education in West Bengal
- J. K. College
