= Purulia Homoeopathic Medical College & Hospital =

Homeopathic medical college in West Bengal, India

- Type: Medical College and Hospital
- Established: 1980; 46 years ago
- Affiliations: West Bengal University of Health Sciences
- Location: Purulia, West Bengal, 723101, India; 23.314662°N 86.3555786°E
- Location in West Bengal Purulia Homoeopathic Medical College & Hospital (India)

Purulia Homoeopathic Medical College & Hospital is a private homoeopathic medical college in Purulia, West Bengal, India. It was established in 1983. It offers the Bachelor of Homeopathic Medicine and Surgery (BHMS) degree course. This institution is recognized by the Central Council of Homoeopathy (CCH), Ministry of Ayush and affiliated with the West Bengal University of Health Sciences.

== See also ==
- List of hospitals in India
- Healthcare in India
- Purulia Government Medical College and Hospital
