= Purulia Zilla School =

Location
- Purulia, West Bengal; India
- Coordinates: 23.3255381°N 86.3577962°E

Information
- Type: 10+2
- Established: 1 May 1853; 172 years ago
- School board: West Bengal Council of Higher Secondary Education; West Bengal Board of Secondary Education
- School district: Purulia
- Principal: Barid Baran Mishra
- Faculty: 30+
- Grades: Class pre primary(nursery and kg) and 1 through XII
- Enrollment: 1500 (approximate)
- Language: Bengali
- Campus: urban
- Affiliation: WBCHSE WBBSE

Purulia Zilla School is one of the oldest existing schools in Purulia district, West Bengal, India. It offers grades from class I to class XII. It has two sections. Grade I to Grade V in the morning section and Grade VI to Grade XII in the Day Section. In the morning section it is run by a Teacher-In-Charge and ten other teachers. In the day section it is run by 28 teachers along with a Headmaster and an Assistant Head Master. Once it was a Co-education School but now it is a Boys' School. The main language of instruction used is Bengali.

== History ==
Purulia Zilla School was established in 1853. Initially it was named as Purulia High School and later it was renamed to Purulia Zilla School. This school was set up by British Rulers in a view to work in the interest of the people and to produce some good quality and skilled employees.

== Affiliation ==
It was under Calcutta University until 1916 and Patna University from 1917 to 1950. It was under Patna Board from 1951 to 1956. Currently it is affiliated to West Bengal Board of Secondary Education for Madhyamik and West Bengal Council of Higher Secondary Education for Higher Secondary.

== Location ==
It is located at a distance of 323 kilometers from Kolkata, the capital city of West Bengal. It is 85 kilometers from Asansol and 250 kilometers from Burdwan. It is situated in the central location of Purulia District. It is two kilometers away from Purulia Railway Station and around half kilometer away from Purulia Bus Stand.

== Infrastructure ==
Purulia Zilla School is situated in 40 acres of land area. It contains 25 classrooms and 6 laboratories. It also has a conference room. There is a boys hostel with capacity of 100 students.

== Library ==
It has a library with a seating capacity of 50 students. It contains 28,740 volumes (as on 31.12.2012).

== See also ==
- Education in India
- List of schools in India
- Education in West Bengal
