= Jangal Sundari Karmanagari =

Industrial complex and township in West Bengal, India

Jangal Sundari Karmanagari জঙ্গল সুন্দরী কর্মনগরী
- Type: Industrial complex and township
- Location: Raghunathpur, Purulia, West Bengal, India
- Founded by: West Bengal Industry Development Corporation (WBIDC); National Industrial Corridor Development and Implementation Trust (NICDIT)
- Region: Jangalmahal
- Area: 2,843 acres (11.51 km^{2})
- Industry: Steel; Cement; Manufacturing
- Notable companies: Rashmi Steel; Shyam Steel; Captain Steel; Maithan Alloys

Jangal Sundari Karmanagari is an under construction industrial city complex and township in Jangalmahal, Purulia in the Indian state of West Bengal.

== Formation ==
The formation of the city was announced by then finance and industries minister Amit Mitra (Government of West Bengal) at Synergie South Bengal, organized by WBIDC in association with CII, Eastern Region in February 2021. Government of West Bengal had initially earmarked over 2,600 acres in Raghunathpur area for Amritsar-Haldia freight corridor as requested by Government of India. But due to delay in that project, the Chief Minister of West Bengal decided to set up an industrial township.

An SPV was formed for the township between West Bengal Industry Development Corporation (WBIDC) and National Industrial Corridor Development and Implementation Trust (NICDIT). It has applied for environment clearance in February 2021.

== Investments and employment ==
Jangal Sundari Karmanagari has projected a potential investment of ₹72,000 Crores. ₹1,144 Crores has been used for creating basic infrastructures. The industrial city will generate employment for 7.75 lakh people. Major industries include cement, steel, auto component, engineering, MSME clusters, ceramics and electricals.

In Phase I of the project, 1749 Acres were allocated and in Phase II, 734 Acres were allocated.

Jangal Sundari Karmanagari has received investments from Rashmi Steel (800 acres), Shyam Steel (600 acres), Captain Steel (300 acres), Super Smelter, Maithan Alloys, Vikash Metal and Power Limited. As of March 2023, about 7 thousand people were employed in around 513 Acres steel factory, which got an investment of ₹3,220 Crores. Shyam Metalics is constructing has acquired 600 Acres and has started construction (as of March 2023) of a steel plant in 600 Acres with an investment of ₹4,591 Crores and expected employment of 10,000 people. A cement factory is under construction in 70 Acres with an investment of ₹400 Crores.
