= J. K. College =

College in Purulia, West Bengal, India

J. K. College, Purulia
- Type: Undergraduate college
- Established: 1948; 78 years ago
- Affiliations: Sidho Kanho Birsha University
- Principal: Shantanu Chatterjee
- Location: Purulia, West Bengal, 723101, India; 23.3171655°N 86.3676373°E
- Campus: Urban
- Website: www.jkcprl.ac.in//
- Location in West Bengal J. K. College (India)

J. K. College, also known by the full name Jagannath Kishore College, established in 1948, is the oldest college in Purulia district, West Bengal, India. It offers undergraduate courses in commerce, arts and sciences, and postgraduate in mathematics, history, and English. It is affiliated to Sidho Kanho Birsha University. The college recently celebrated its 75th birthday.

== History ==
Jagannath Kishore College, established in 1948, started as a private affiliating college of Patna University. It is the first college in the Manbhum district of Bihar, now the district of Purulia in West Bengal. Gokul Kumari Devi, the widow of Sri Jagannath Kishor Lal Sing Deo of the Kashipur Raj, donated a fund of one lakh rupees for the foundation of this college. Shankarlal Singhania, an eminent businessman of that time, also donated an amount of sixteen thousand rupees for the establishment of the college. The college was named after Jagannath Kishorlal Sing Deo, and started with 109 students in I.A. course. When this district annexed with West Bengal in 1956 and renamed as Purulia, then this college came under the University of Calcutta. This college was later affiliated with University of Burdwan in 1961. This college was taken over as a sponsored college by the Government of West Bengal in 1963. In 2010, the college's affiliation changed from Burdwan University to Sidho Kanho Birsha University.

== Departments and Courses ==
The college offers different undergraduate and postgraduate courses and aims at imparting education to the undergraduates of lower- and middle-class people of Purulia and its adjoining areas.

=== Science ===
Science faculty consists of the departments of Chemistry, Physics, Mathematics, Geology Computer Science, Botany, Zoology and Microbiology

=== Arts and Commerce ===
Arts & Commerce faculty consists of departments of Bengali, Santali, English, Economics, Sanskrit, Hindi, History, Geography, Political Science, Philosophy, Education, Urdu, and Commerce.

== Accreditation ==
The college is recognized by the University Grants Commission (UGC). It was accredited by the National Assessment and Accreditation Council (NAAC) in 2005, and awarded B+ grade, an accreditation that has since then expired. The college was recognized as a College with Potential Excellence (CPE) in 2010 by UGC.

=== Hostels ===
There are four hostels attached with J.K. College, three for boys and one for girls. Thakkar-Bappa hostel for boys is the oldest one, followed by CRRM hostel for boys, Central sc hostel for boys and Gokul Kumari Devi hostel for girls.

== See also ==
- List of institutions of higher education in West Bengal
- Education in India
- Education in West Bengal
- Nistarini Women's College
- Sidho Kanho Birsha University
