= Sidho Kanho Birsha University =

Public university in Purulia, India

Sidho-Kanho-Birsha University
- Motto: sa no buddhyā śubhayā saṁyunaktu
- Motto in English: let the Almighty bestow on us blessed thought
- Type: Public State University
- Established: 6 July 2010 (16 years ago)
- Accreditation: NAAC
- Academic affiliations: UGC; AIU; AICTE
- Budget: ₹30.20 crore (US$3.1 million) (FY2024–25 est.)
- Chancellor: Governor of West Bengal
- Vice-Chancellor: Pabitra Kumar Chakraborti
- Faculty: 107 (2025)
- Students: 3,381 (2025)
- Postgraduates: 2,949 (2025)
- Doctoral students: 432 (2025)
- Location: Purulia, West Bengal, India; 23°21′41″N 86°20′23″E
- Campus: Rural 12.86 acres (5.20 ha)
- Website: www.skbu.ac.in

Sidho-Kanho-Birsha University (SKBU) is a public state university located in Purulia district of West Bengal, India. It was established under an Act of the West Bengal Legislature in April 2010. It offers different undergraduate and postgraduate courses in liberal arts.

== History ==
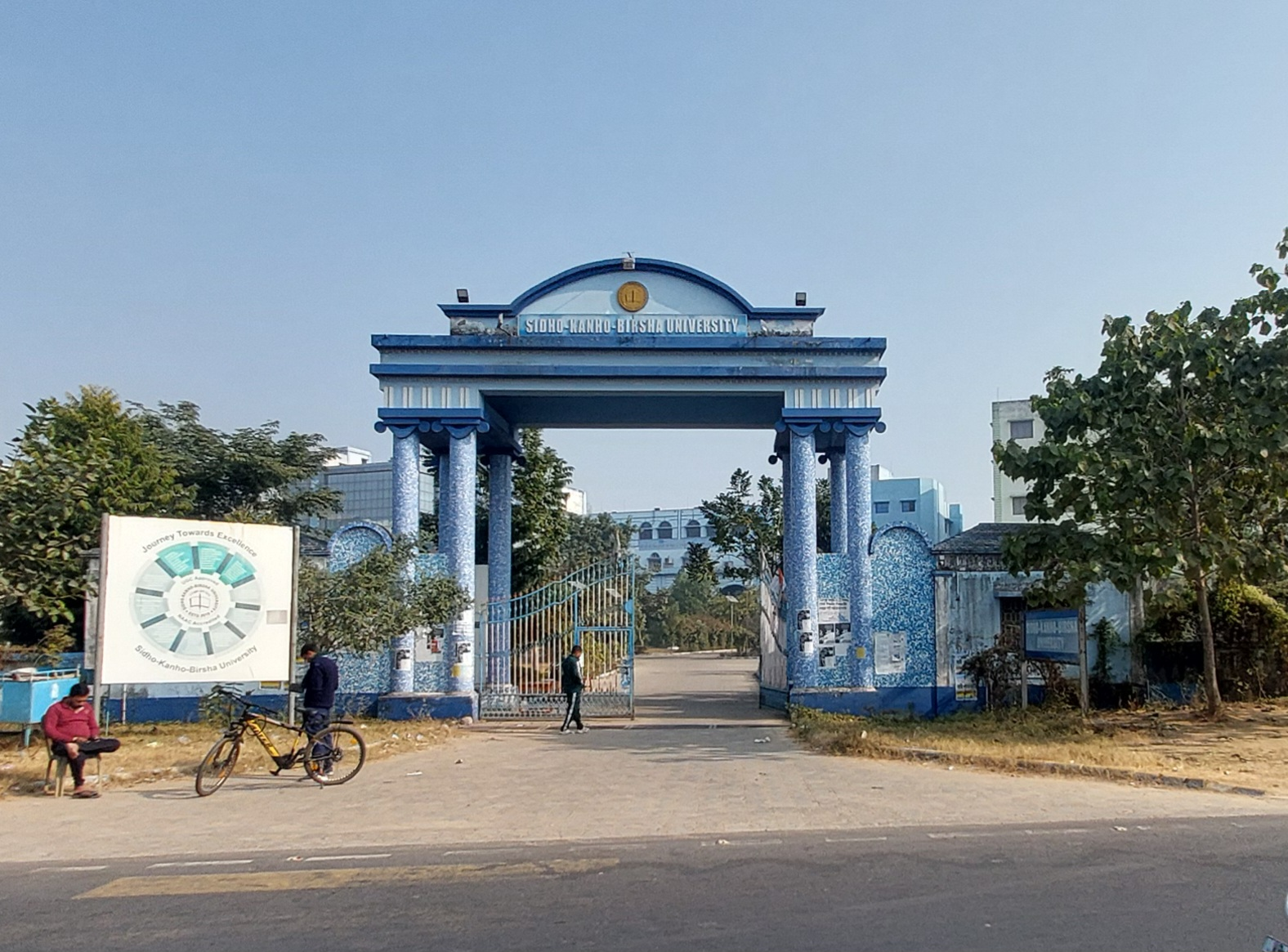
The main entrance of Sidho Kanho Birsha University

The university was founded on 6 July 2010 by the Sidho Kanho Brisha University Act, 2010, passed by the West Bengal Legislature.Jagannath Kishore College, Purulia donated 13 acres to the university for the establishment. The university is named for three rebels who put up resistance against British rule: Sidhu Murmu, Kanhu Murmu, and Birsa Munda.

Tapati Mukherjee was appointed as the first vice-chancellor of this university. One of the important focus of this university is to promote and protect indigenous culture and language — especially the Santali language. Its post-graduate departments started functioning from the 2011-12 session with 12 academic departments (Bengali, English, Sanskrit, Santali, History, Political Science, Philosophy, Education, Physics, Chemistry, Mathematics & Commerce). Over the years in an expansive and forward-looking drive, they grew to 19 departments with the introduction to Economics, Sociology, Tribal Studies, Geography, Zoology, Botany & Psychology department, many of which are in the frontier areas of Science and Social Sciences.

== Campus and location ==
The total area of university campuses in the semi-rural areas is 12.86 acres. This land is donated by Jagannath Kishore College, Purulia.

The campus is located in the Purulia district, beside the Purulia-Ranchi national highway (NH 32). It is 7 Km from the Purulia railway station and 3 Km from the Purulia central bus stand. Ajodhya Hills is prominently visible from the university campus.

University expanded its infrastructure through a 53-acre second campus in Chharra, Purulia. Allotted by the West Bengal government in 2019, the "green campus" project integrated advanced research facilities, a sports complex, and a biodiversity park to enhance the institution's academic capacity.

== Organisation and administration ==
=== Governance ===
The Vice-chancellor of the Sidho-Kanho-Birsha University is the chief executive officer of the university. Dipak Kumar Kar is the current Vice-chancellor of the university.

List of All Vice-Chancellors
No.	Name
1.	Tapati Mukherjee
2.	Samita Manna
3.	Dipak Ranjan Mandal
4.	Dipak Kumar Kar
5.	Dhananjoy Rakshit
6.	Pabitra Kumar Chakraborti (Incumbent)

=== Faculties and Departments ===
Sidho Kanho Birsha University has 22 departments organized into three faculties: Science, Arts, and Commerce.

- Faculty of Science

This faculty consists of the departments of Botany, Physics, Chemistry, Mathematics, Computer Science, Psychology, Geography, Biotechnology, Environmental Science, and Zoology.

- Faculty of Arts and Social Science

This faculty consists of the departments of Anthropology and Tribal Studies, Bengali, English, Economics, Education, History, Political Science, Philosophy, Journalism and Mass Communication, Sanskrit, Santali, Kudmali, Law, and Sociology.

- Faculty of Commerce

This faculty consists of the departments of Commerce, and Master of Business Administration (MBA).

=== Affiliations ===
Sidho Kanho Birsha University (SKBU) is an affiliating university with jurisdiction over the colleges of the Purulia district. The university has 31 colleges. Among them 21 are degree colleges and ten are B.Ed. colleges and professional colleges, including Kotshila Mahavidyalaya.

== Academics ==
=== Admission ===
One has to pass higher secondary (10+2) and graduation (10+2+3) levels for admission to undergraduate and postgraduate courses of the university. For Ph.D. level admission, One has to qualify National Eligibility Test (NET) examination or Research qualifying test (RET) conducted by the University.

=== Diploma and Certificate Courses ===
Besides different undergraduate and postgraduate courses, SKBU also offers different diploma and certificate courses. These courses are generally of shorter duration compared to degree-level courses. Specifically, it offers one-year diploma courses in Chhau dance (Indian semi-classical folk dance of this region) and Jhumur (folk song of this region). It also offers six-month certificate courses on different topics to preserve the indigenous identity of this locality. This is the only university that offers certificate courses in Kudmali language and Santali Scriptology.

=== Accreditation ===
Sidho Kanho Birsha University (SKBU) has been awarded B+ grade by the National Assessment and Accreditation Council (NAAC).

== Research contribution ==
Researchers from the University published a study in the Journal of Social Studies analyzing environmental attitudes among Purulia's undergraduates. Using two-step clustering, the research identified critical correlations between emotional and cognitive factors, emphasizing how demographics influenced regional ecological perspectives.

Researchers discovered a 52-million-year-old flower fossil in a West Bengal coal mine, providing evidence of a prehistoric botanical link between India and Australia. This Eocene-era find, belonging to the Coryphoid palm family, suggests that diverse floral lineages migrated across the Gondwana supercontinent before the tectonic separation of landmasses.
