= Purulia =

City in West Bengal, India

- City
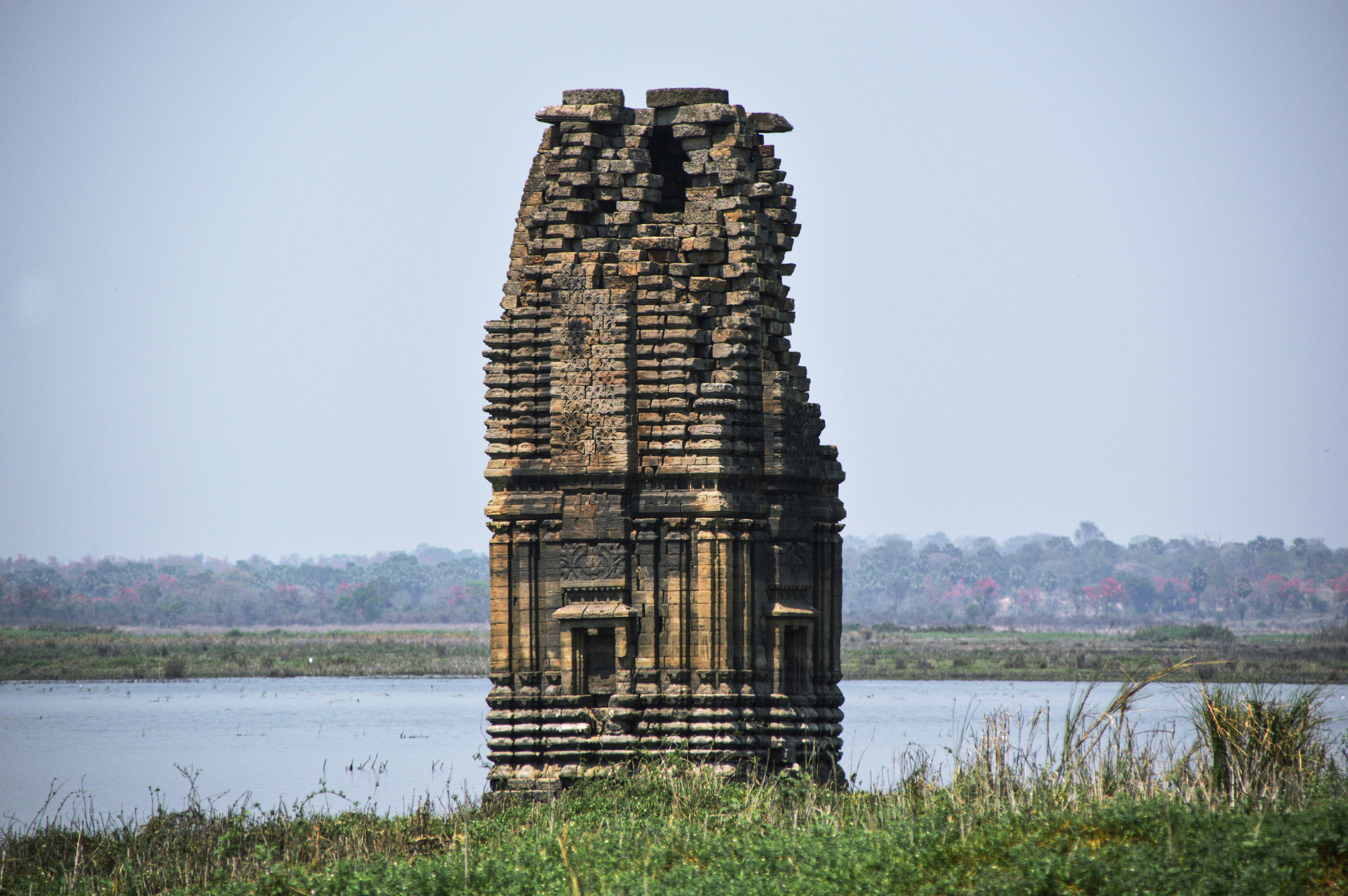
- Telkupi, Purulia

- Location in West Bengal, India Purulia (India) Purulia (Asia)
- Coordinates: 23°19′52.668″N 86°21′41.738″E
- Country: India
- State: West Bengal
- District: Purulia
- Established: 1838

Government
  - Type: Municipality
  - Body: Purulia Municipality

Area
  - Total: 12.63 km^{2} (4.88 sq mi)
- Elevation: 240 m (790 ft)

Population (2011)
  - Total: 121,436
  - Density: 9,615/km^{2} (24,900/sq mi)

Languages
  - Official: Bengali
  - Additional official: English
- Time zone: UTC+5:30 (IST)
- Postal codes: 723 101, 02, 03.
- Telephone code: 91 (0)3252
- Vehicle registration: WB-56
- Sex ratio: 955 ♀/1000♂
- Literacy: 82.34 %
- Lok Sabha constituency: Purulia
- Vidhan Sabha constituency: Purulia
- Website: purulia.gov.in

Purulia, officially Purulia Sadar, is a city and a municipality in the Indian state of West Bengal. It is the headquarters of the Purulia district and is located on the north of the Kangsabati River.

== Geography ==
Places in Purulia Sadar subdivision in Purulia district
M: municipality, CT: census town, R: rural/ urban centre, H: historical/ religious centre, F: facility
Owing to space constraints in the small map, the actual locations in a larger map may vary slightly

=== Location ===
Purulia is located at 23.33°N 86.37°E. It has an average elevation of 228 metres (748 feet).

=== Area overview ===
Purulia district forms the lowest step of the Chota Nagpur Plateau. The general landscape is undulating land with scattered hills. Purulia Sadar subdivision covers the central portion of the district. 83.80% of the population of the subdivision lives in rural areas. The map alongside shows some urbanization around Purulia city. 18.58% of the population, the highest among the subdivisions of the district, lives in urban areas. There are 4 census towns in the subdivision. The Kangsabati (locally called Kansai) flows through the subdivision. The subdivision has old temples, some of them belonging to the 11th century or earlier. The focus is on education - the university, the sainik school, the Ramakrishna Mission Vidyapith at Bongabari, the upcoming medical college at Hatuara, et al.

The area is served by the Purulia Junction railway station.

Note: The map alongside presents some of the notable locations in the subdivision. All places marked in the map are linked in the larger full screen map.

=== Climate ===
Summers are hot and dry, with temperatures ranging from lows of 23 °C to highs above 38 °C. Winters are dry and cool, with daily temperatures ranging from 12 °C to 26 °C. Most of the rainfall occurs during the wet monsoons.

Climate data for Purulia (1991–2020, extremes 1901–2020)
Month	Jan	Feb	Mar	Apr	May	Jun	Jul	Aug	Sep	Oct	Nov	Dec	Year
Record high °C (°F)	33.4 (92.1)	37.3 (99.1)	41.7 (107.1)	46.0 (114.8)	46.3 (115.3)	46.2 (115.2)	40.7 (105.3)	37.8 (100.0)	39.0 (102.2)	36.3 (97.3)	35.1 (95.2)	33.3 (91.9)	46.3 (115.3)
Mean daily maximum °C (°F)	24.2 (75.6)	28.2 (82.8)	33.1 (91.6)	37.4 (99.3)	37.9 (100.2)	35.2 (95.4)	31.9 (89.4)	31.6 (88.9)	31.8 (89.2)	31.4 (88.5)	28.7 (83.7)	25.0 (77.0)	31.3 (88.3)
Mean daily minimum °C (°F)	11.8 (53.2)	15.4 (59.7)	19.8 (67.6)	24.2 (75.6)	25.9 (78.6)	26.0 (78.8)	25.6 (78.1)	25.5 (77.9)	24.8 (76.6)	22.2 (72.0)	17.2 (63.0)	12.8 (55.0)	20.9 (69.6)
Record low °C (°F)	3.8 (38.8)	6.3 (43.3)	10.7 (51.3)	13.5 (56.3)	15.6 (60.1)	18.3 (64.9)	17.8 (64.0)	17.2 (63.0)	17.0 (62.6)	13.2 (55.8)	7.7 (45.9)	5.7 (42.3)	3.8 (38.8)
Average rainfall mm (inches)	19.7 (0.78)	15.3 (0.60)	25.8 (1.02)	39.7 (1.56)	81.9 (3.22)	250.6 (9.87)	341.2 (13.43)	295.8 (11.65)	241.7 (9.52)	92.9 (3.66)	19.3 (0.76)	13.6 (0.54)	1,437.5 (56.59)
Average rainy days	1.7	1.3	2.5	2.9	5.5	12.6	16.4	15.3	10.5	4.3	0.9	1.0	75.0
Average relative humidity (%) (at 17:30 IST)	52	43	36	36	48	66	77	79	75	68	59	57	58
Source: India Meteorological Department

== Administration ==
=== Police stations ===
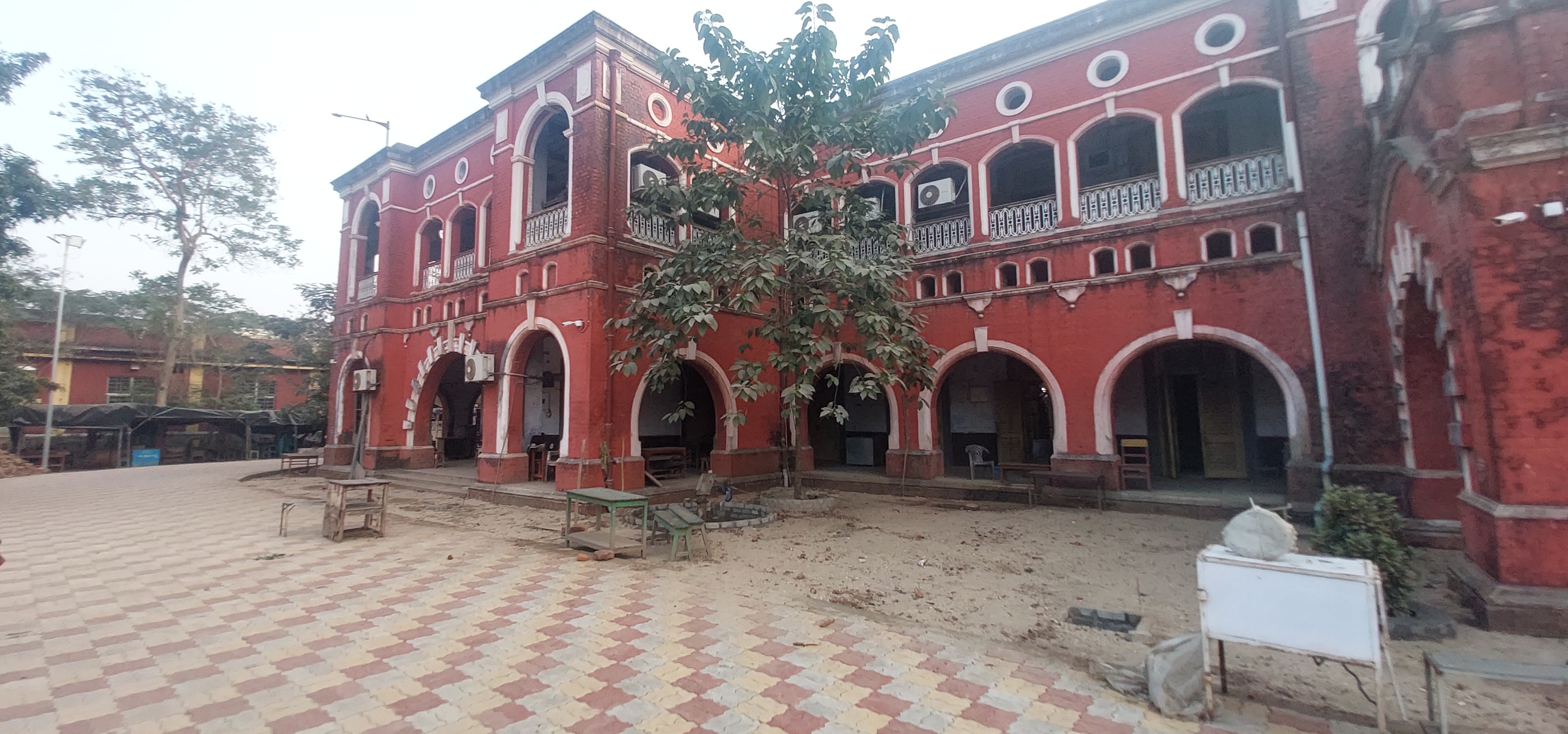
Purulia District Court

Purulia (Town) police station has jurisdiction over Purulia municipality and parts of Purulia I and Purulia II CD Blocks. The area covered is 13.9 km^{2} and the population covered is 151,210.

== Demographics ==
Historical population
Year	Pop.	±%
1872	5,696	—
1881	9,305	+63.4%
1891	12,128	+30.3%
1901	17,291	+42.6%
1911	20,886	+20.8%
Source: Census of India

=== Languages ===
Languages spoken in Purulia city (2011)
1. Bengali (83.6%)
2. Hindi (10.5%)
3. Urdu (4.44%)
4. Santali (0.32%)
5. Marwari (0.30%)
6. Other (0.83%)

Purulia (Muffasil) police station has jurisdiction over parts of Purulia I and Purulia II CD Blocks. The area covered is 434.57 km^{2} and the population covered is 235,853.

Purulia Sadar Women police station was opened in 2014 at Bhatbandh, As of 2016, it is covering the jurisdiction of Purulia (T) PS, Purulia (M) PS, Kotshila PS, Arsha PS, Jhalda PS and Joypur PS.

== Education ==
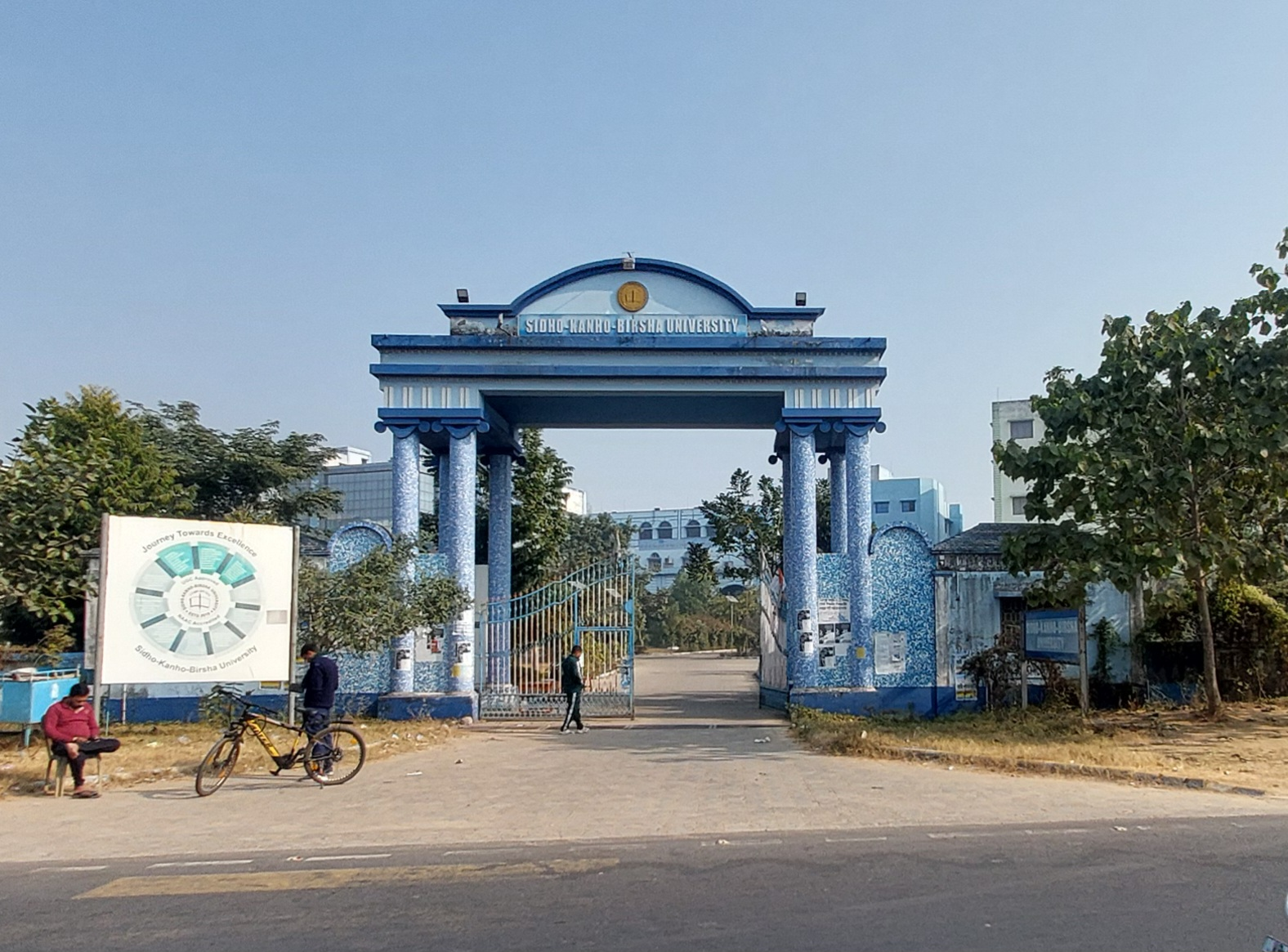
Sidho Kanho Birsha University

=== University ===
- Sidho Kanho Birsha University

=== Degree colleges ===
- Raghunathpur College
- Mahatma Gandhi College, Purulia
- Bikramjit Goswami Memorial College
- Balarampur College
- J.K. College, Purulia
- Kashipur Michael Madhusudhan Mahavidyalaya
- Nistarini Women's College

=== Engineering colleges ===
- Ramkrishna Mahato Government Engineering College

=== Medical colleges ===
- Purulia Government Medical College and Hospital
- Purulia Homoeopathic Medical College & Hospital

=== Polytechnic colleges ===
- Purulia Polytechnic

=== Schools ===
- Sainik School, Purulia
- Purulia Zilla School
- Ramakrishna Mission Vidyapith

== Notable Resident ==
- Gambhir Singh Mura
- Shraddha Das

== See also ==
- Purulia arms drop scandal
