= Kamarhati =

- City
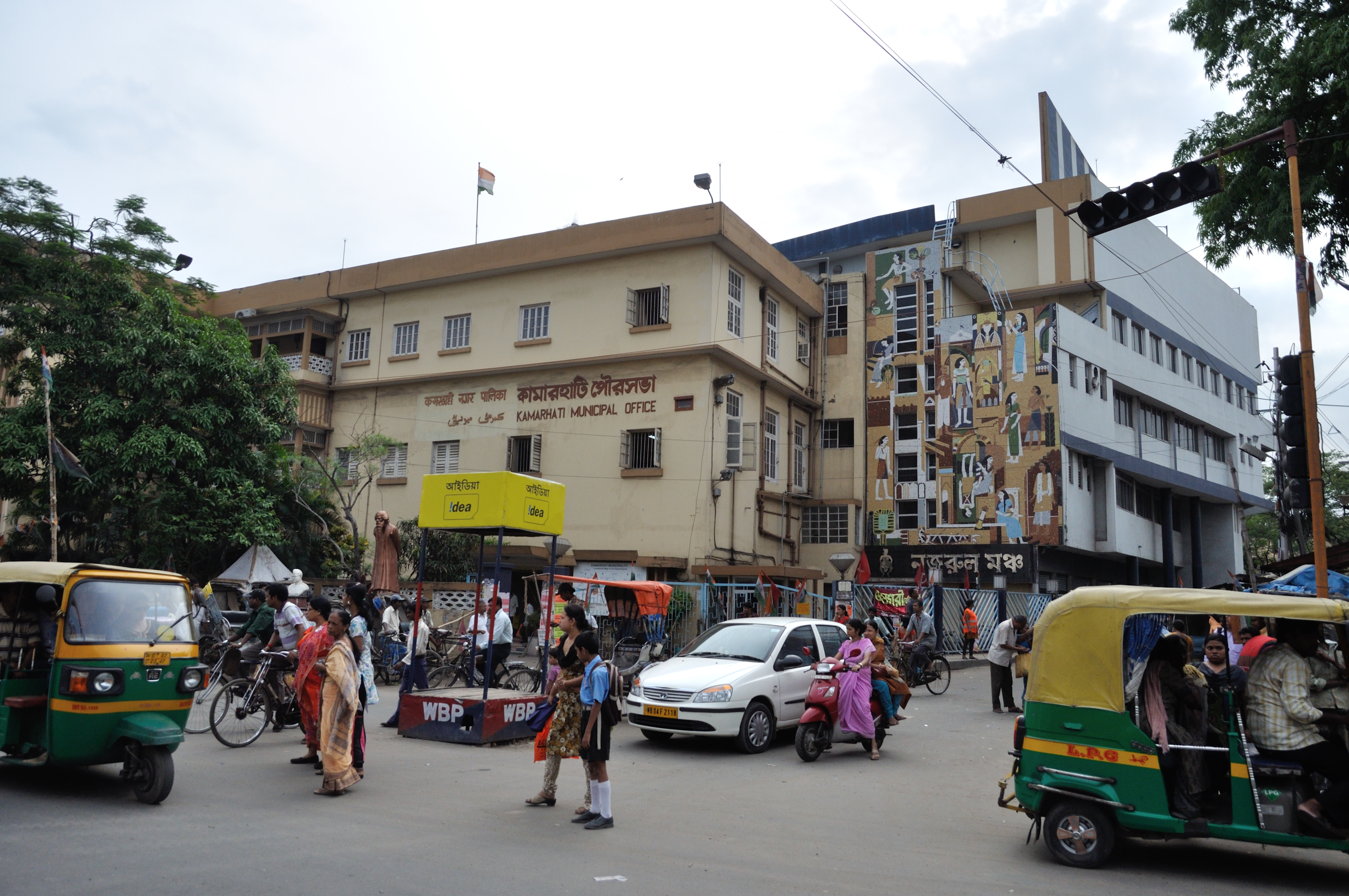
- Kamarhati Municipality

- Location West Bengal, India Kamarhati (West Bengal) Kamarhati (India)
- Coordinates: 22.66862°N 88.3704°E
- Country: India
- State: West Bengal
- Division: Presidency
- District: North 24 Parganas

Government
  - Type: Municipality
  - Body: Kamarhati Municipality
  - Member of Legislative Assembly (MLA): Madan Mitra
  - Chairman: Vacant
  - Vice Chairman: Tushar Chatterjee

Area
  - Total: 10.96 km^{2} (4.23 sq mi)
- Elevation: 15 m (49 ft)

Population (2011)
  - Total: 330,211
  - Density: 30,130/km^{2} (78,030/sq mi)

Languages
  - Official: Bengali, English
- Time zone: UTC+5:30 (IST)
- PIN: 700035, 700056, 700057, 700058, 700076, 700083, 700109
- Telephone code: +91 33
- ISO 3166 code: IN-WB
- Vehicle registration: WB
- Lok Sabha constituency: Dum Dum
- Vidhan Sabha constituency: Kamarhati

Kamarhati is a city and a municipality of North 24 Parganas district in the Indian state of West Bengal. It is a part of the area covered by Kolkata Metropolitan Development Authority (KMDA).

== History ==
Kamarhati was earlier a part of North Suburban Municipality. In 1881-82 it was renamed Baranagar Municipality and Kamarhati became a part of it. In 1899, Kamarhati was separated from Baranagar Municipality and Kamarhati Municipality came into existence.

During the British Raj it was a place for bungalows and gardens where the rich 'Babu' of Kolkata used to come.

With the partition of Bengal in 1947, "millions of refugees poured in from erstwhile East Pakistan." In the initial stages bulk of the refugees were non-agriculturists. A few of them made their own arrangements, but "it was squatters who made the East Bengali refugees famous or infamous." Squatting (jabardakhal in Bengali) ranged from the forcible occupation of barracks to the collective take-over of private, government and waste land. By 1949, there were 65 refugee colonies in the Dum Dum and Panihati zone. The squatters were in a way "self-settlers" in the absence of adequate official arrangements for rehabilitation. Within a very short time the refugees (quite often with government or administrative support) not only found a place to stay but developed a society with markets, schools, temples and sometimes even colleges, hospitals and recreational centres.

== Geography ==
Cities and towns in the southern portion of Barrackpore subdivision in North 24 Parganas district
M: municipal city/ town, CT: census town,
N: neighbourhood
Owing to space constraints in the small map, the actual locations in a larger map may vary slightly.

=== Location ===
Kamarhati is located at 22.67°N 88.37°E. Neighbourhoods such as Belgharia, Ariadaha and Dakshineswar are part of this Municipality. The Kamarhati Municipality is located at Rathtala on B.T. Road. The sacred Dakshineshwar Kali Temple is situated in Kamarhati Municipal area.

Kamarhati is bounded by Khardaha and Panihati on the north, North Dumdum on the east, Baranagar on the south and the Hooghly River on the west.

96% of the population of Barrackpore subdivision (partly presented in the map alongside, all places marked in the map are linked in the full screen map) lives in urban areas. In 2011, it had a density of population of 10,967 per km^{2}. The subdivision has 16 municipalities and 24 census towns.

For most of the cities and towns, information regarding density of population is available in the infobox. Population data is not available for neighbourhoods. It is available for the entire municipal area and thereafter ward-wise.

=== Police station ===
Belgharia police station under Barrackpore Police Commissionerate has jurisdiction over Kamarhati Municipal area.

== Demographics ==
=== Population ===
Historical population
Year	Pop.	±%
1901	13,216	—
1911	18,015	+36.3%
1921	23,018	+27.8%
1931	30,334	+31.8%
1941	42,545	+40.3%
1951	77,251	+81.6%
1961	125,457	+62.4%
1971	169,404	+35.0%
1981	234,951	+38.7%
1991	266,889	+13.6%
2001	314,507	+17.8%
2011	330,211	+5.0%
Source: Census of India

As per the 2011 Census of India, Kamarhati had a total population of 330,211, of which 170,293 (52%) were males and 159,918 (48%) were females. The population below 6 years was 25,350. The total number of literates in Kamarhati was 267,267 (87.67% of the population over 6 years).

As of 2001 India census, Kamarhati had a population of 314,334. Males constituted 54% of the population and females 46%. Kamarhati had an average literacy rate of 77%, higher than the national average of 59.5%: male literacy was 81% and female literacy was 72%. In Kamarhati, 9% of the population was under 6 years of age.

=== Kolkata Urban Agglomeration ===
The following municipalities, census towns and other locations in Barrackpore subdivision were part of Kolkata Urban Agglomeration in the 2011 census: Kanchrapara (M), Jetia (CT), Halisahar (M), Balibhara (CT), Naihati (M), Bhatpara (M), Kaugachhi (CT), Garshyamnagar (CT), Garulia (M), Ichhapur Defence Estate (CT), North Barrackpur (M), Barrackpur Cantonment (CB), Barrackpore (M), Jafarpur (CT), Ruiya (CT), Titagarh (M), Khardaha (M), Bandipur (CT), Panihati (M), Muragachha (CT) New Barrackpore (M), Chandpur (CT), Talbandha (CT), Patulia (CT), Kamarhati (M), Baranagar (M), South Dumdum (M), North Dumdum (M), Dum Dum (M), Noapara (CT), Babanpur (CT), Teghari (CT), Nanna (OG), Chakla (OG), Srotribati (OG) and Panpur (OG).

=== Languages ===
Languages spoken in Kamarhati City (2011)
1. Bengali (62.8%)
2. Urdu (25.8%)
3. Hindi (9.85%)
4. Odia (0.68%)
5. Bhojpuri (0.13%)
6. Others (0.72%)

== Infrastructure ==
As per the District Census Handbook 2011, Kamarhati Municipal city covered an area of 10.96 km^{2}. Amongst the civic amenities it had both open and covered drains. Amongst the educational facilities It had 97 primary schools, 39 secondary schools, 21 senior secondary schools, two degree colleges for arts/science/commerce and 20 non-formal education centres. Amongst the social, recreational and cultural facilities it had one cinema/theatre, three auditoriums/community halls and 30 public libraries. It had 15 bank branches.

According to Barrackpore administration, the educational facilities available in Kamarhati are: 97 primary schools, 20 secondary schools, 18 private English-medium schools, 21 higher secondary schools and two degree colleges. Medical facilities are College of Medicine & Sagore Dutta Hospital (with 150 beds) at Kamarhati, ESI Hospital at Kamarhati, Sri Ramkrishna Matrimangal at Ariadaha, Sahid Khudiram Health Institute at Belgharia and Arogya at Belgharia. Amongst the other facilities are: 268.95 km of roads (260.80 km pucca, 6.15 km kucha), 456.17 km drains (422.67 km pucca, 33.5 km kuchha), 16 markets, three post offices, eight sub-post offices, three cinema halls, 30 libraries, one ferry ghat, 24 play grounds (four big and 20 small), one electric crematorium, two burning ghats and two Muslim burial grounds. 22,533 houses have water connection and there are 595 street taps.

== Economy ==
=== Industry ===
Some of the industries in Kamarhati are:

- Texmaco Rail and Engineering Limited, with five manufacturing units. Founded in 1939 by K.K. Birla, it is now the flagship company of the Adventz Group, headed by Saroj Poddar.
- Kamarhatty Company Limited, founded in 1877 by Jardine Henderson Ltd., is one of the oldest functioning composite jute mills in the world. It is now part of the Kamarhatty Group, under the leadership of B.P. Agarwal.
- Agarpara Jute Mills caters to both foreign and Indian markets.
- Prabartak Jute Mills Limited, incorporated in 1935, is presently headed by Brij Mohan Mall.
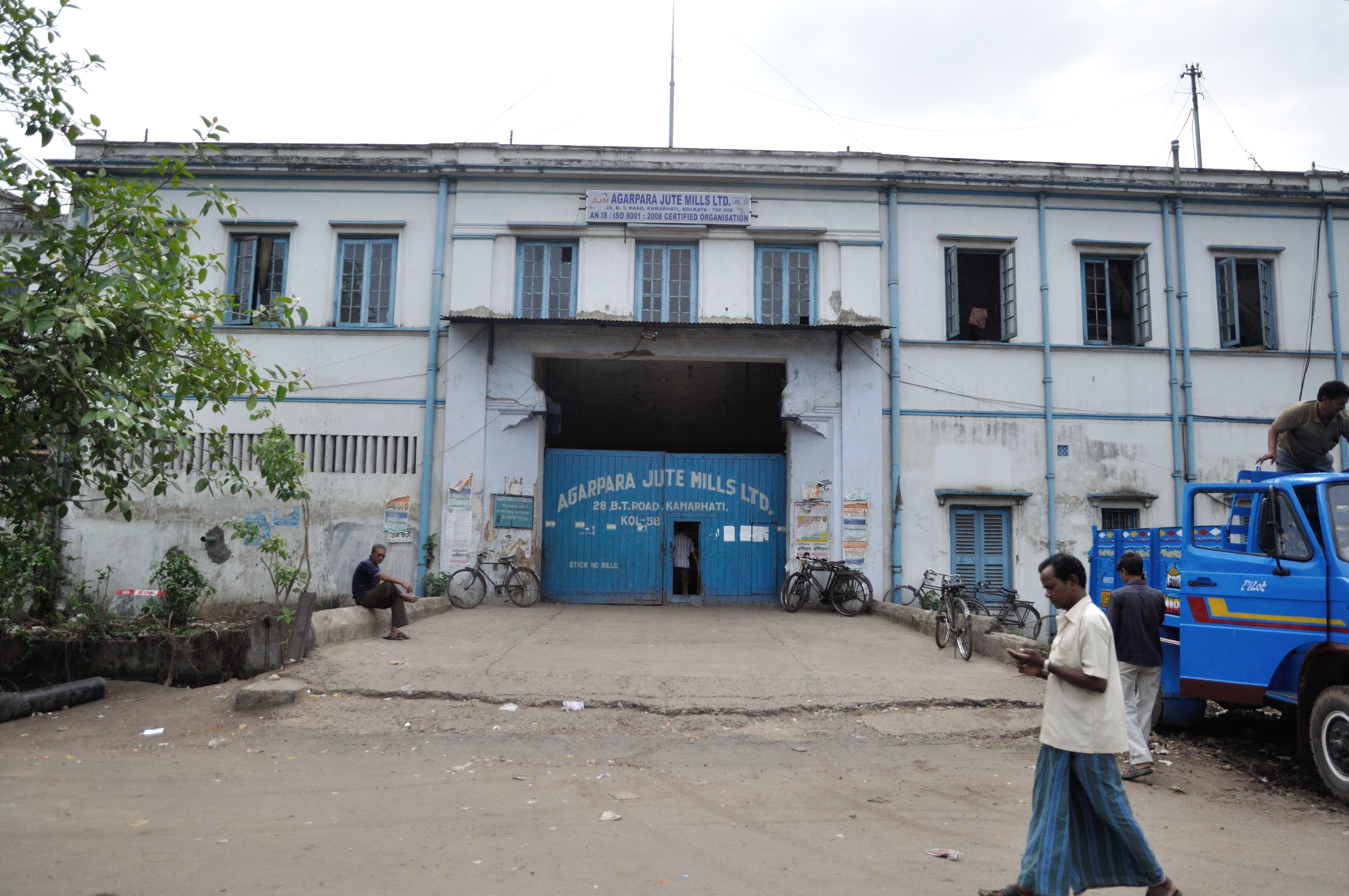
Agarpara Jute Mills

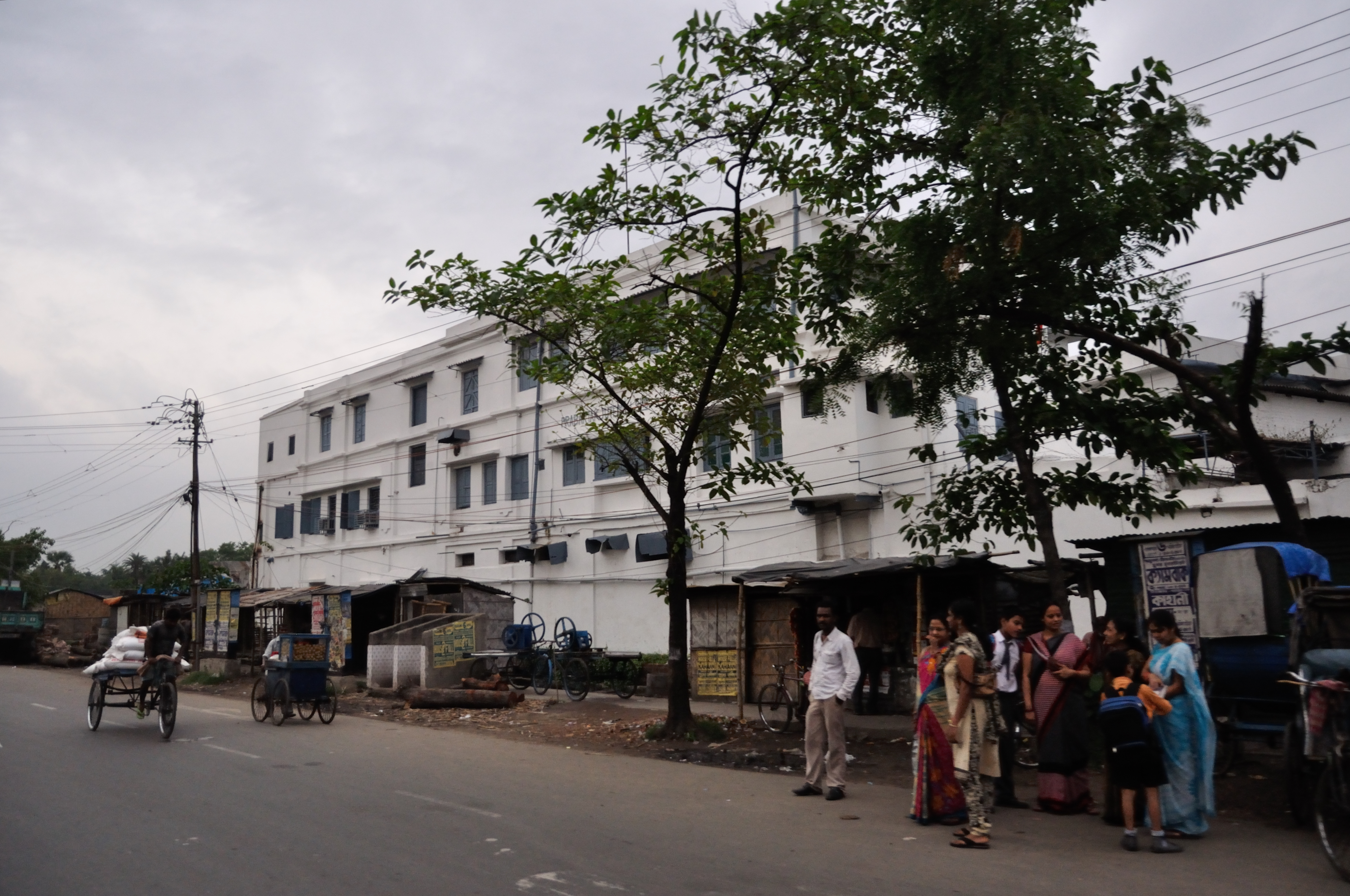
Prabartak Jute Mills
- NTC Industries Limited incorporated in 1931 as the National Tobacco Company of India, is one of the oldest manufacturer of cigarettes in India. The present management team is composed of Upamanyu Pathak, Gourav Somani and others.
- TIL Limited (Tractors India), established in 1944, it is one of the leading material handling, lifting and port equipment designers and manufacturers in India. Sumit Mazumdar is the chairman and managing director.
- WIMCO, a Swedish match company, which established in the 1920s a factory at Dakshineswar, was taken over by ITC Limited in 2011.
- ESSDEE Aluminium, the pioneers and one of the largest producers of aluminium foils in Asia, was initially established as Venesta Foils in 1905 at Kamarhati.
- Allied Ceramics Private Limited, manufacturer and exporter of high and low tension porcetrical poceleilain insulators was established at Belgharia in 1977.
- Emami Paper Mills Limited manufactures newsprint from waste paper. It is one of the larger producers of newsprint in the country. It has two plants – one at Dakshineswar and the other at Balgopalpur, Balasore.

=== KMDA ===
Kamarhati Municipality is included in the Kolkata Metropolitan Area for which the KMDA is the statutory planning and development authority.

== Transport ==
=== Rail ===
Kamarhati has two important rail stations nearby on Sealdah-Ranaghat line by the Eastern Railway suburban network: Agarpara railway station and Belgharia railway station.

=== Road ===
The B.T. Road which passes through the heart of the town provides ample road transport. Other roads include like Graham Road, Agarpara station road, Feeder Road, and D.D. Mondal Ghat Road.

== Education ==
There are many schools in this locality like Ariadaha Kalachand High School, Ariadaha Sarbamangala Balika vidyalaya, Belgharia High School, Belgharia Mahakali Uchcha Balika Vidyalaya, Dakshineswar High School, Ariadaha Girls' High School, Kamarhati High School, Salimiah High School, Kamarhati Sagar Dutta free high school, and Belgharia Deshapriya Vidyalaya. There some private schools like Techno India Group school and Adamas International School.

Bhairab Ganguly College was established at Belgharia in 1968. It offers honours courses in Bengali, English, Sanskrit, Hindi, Urdu, history, philosophy, political science, geography, education, physical education, physics, chemistry, mathematics, botany, zoology, physiology, economics, electronics, computer science, accountancy and general BA, BSc and B Com courses.

Hiralal Mazumdar Memorial College for Women was established at Dakshineswar in 1959. It offers honours courses in Bengali, English, Sanskrit, sociology, history, political science, philosophy, education, journalism, music, geography, economics, zoology, botany, food & nutrition, psychology, chemistry and general courses in BA and B Sc.

There are also Adyapeath Annada Polytechnic College and Ramkrishna Mission Shilpapitha.

== Healthcare ==
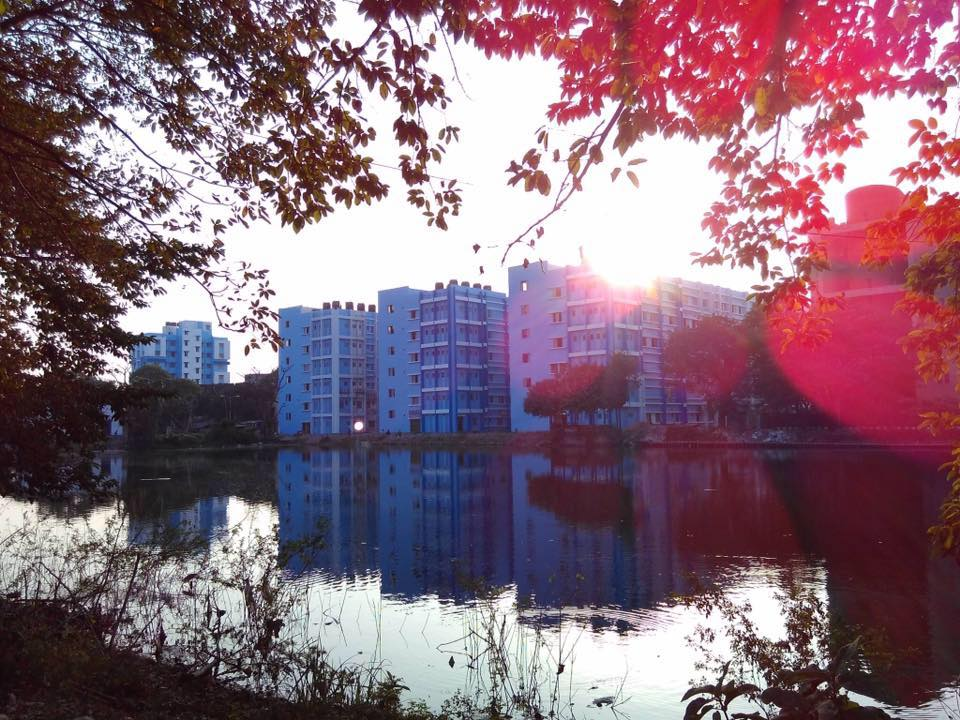
College of Medicine & Sagore Dutta Hospital (CMSDH)

College of Medicine & Sagore Dutta Hospital (CMSDH) was started by the Government of West Bengal in 2010 and MBBS course was started in 2011. The hospital functions with 131 beds.

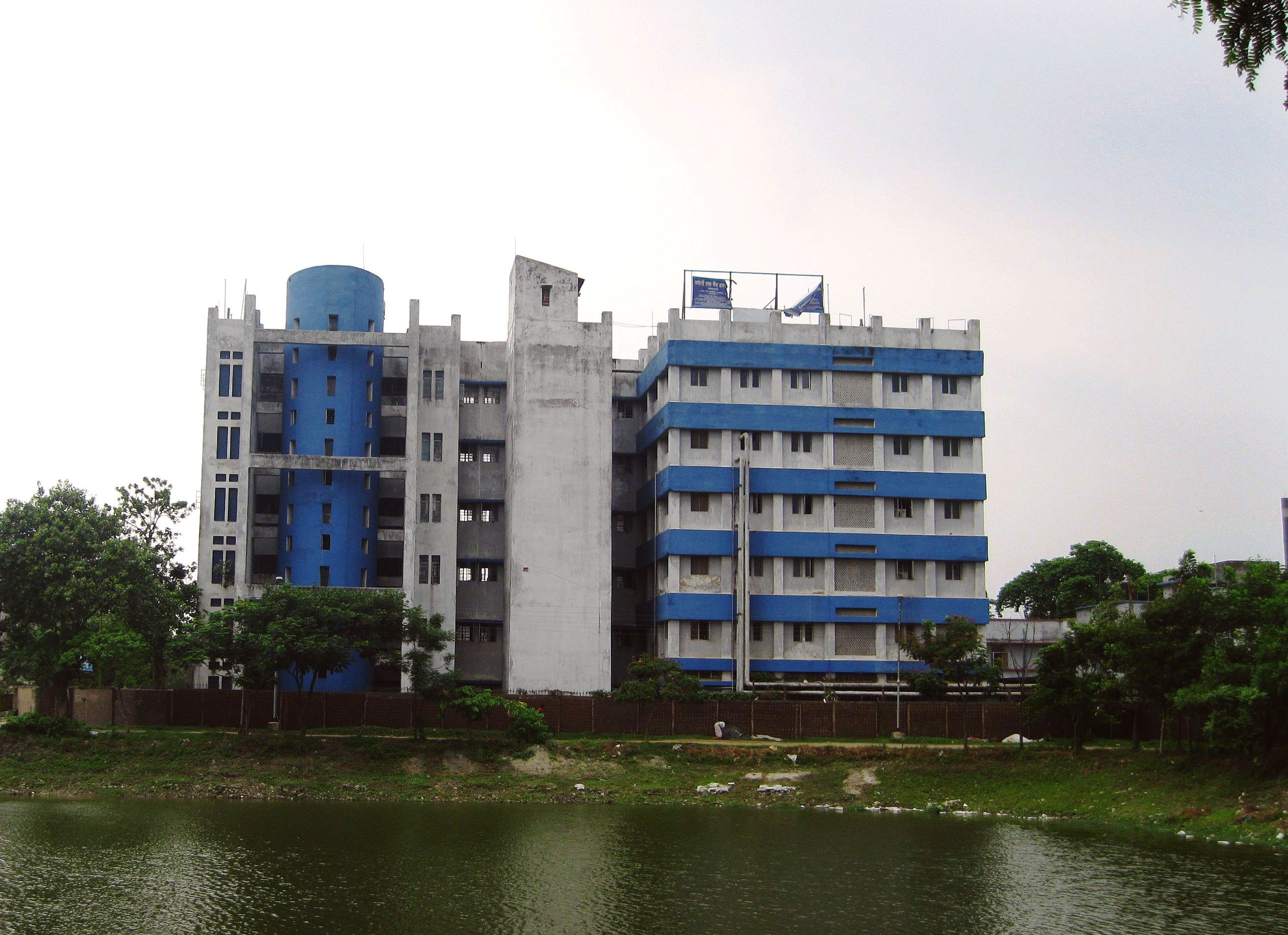
ESI Hospital at Kamarhati

ESI Hospital, Kamarhati, functions with 350 beds. Facilities like medical, surgical, gynecological, obstetrics and ophthalmological besides ent is available. Both indoor and outdoor facilities are provided.

Ariadaha Hospital is another important hospital.

North 24 Parganas district has been identified as one of the areas where ground water is affected by arsenic contamination.

== See also ==
- Cities and towns in Barrackpore subdivision
