= Harinath De =

Indian linguist, polyglot and Indologist

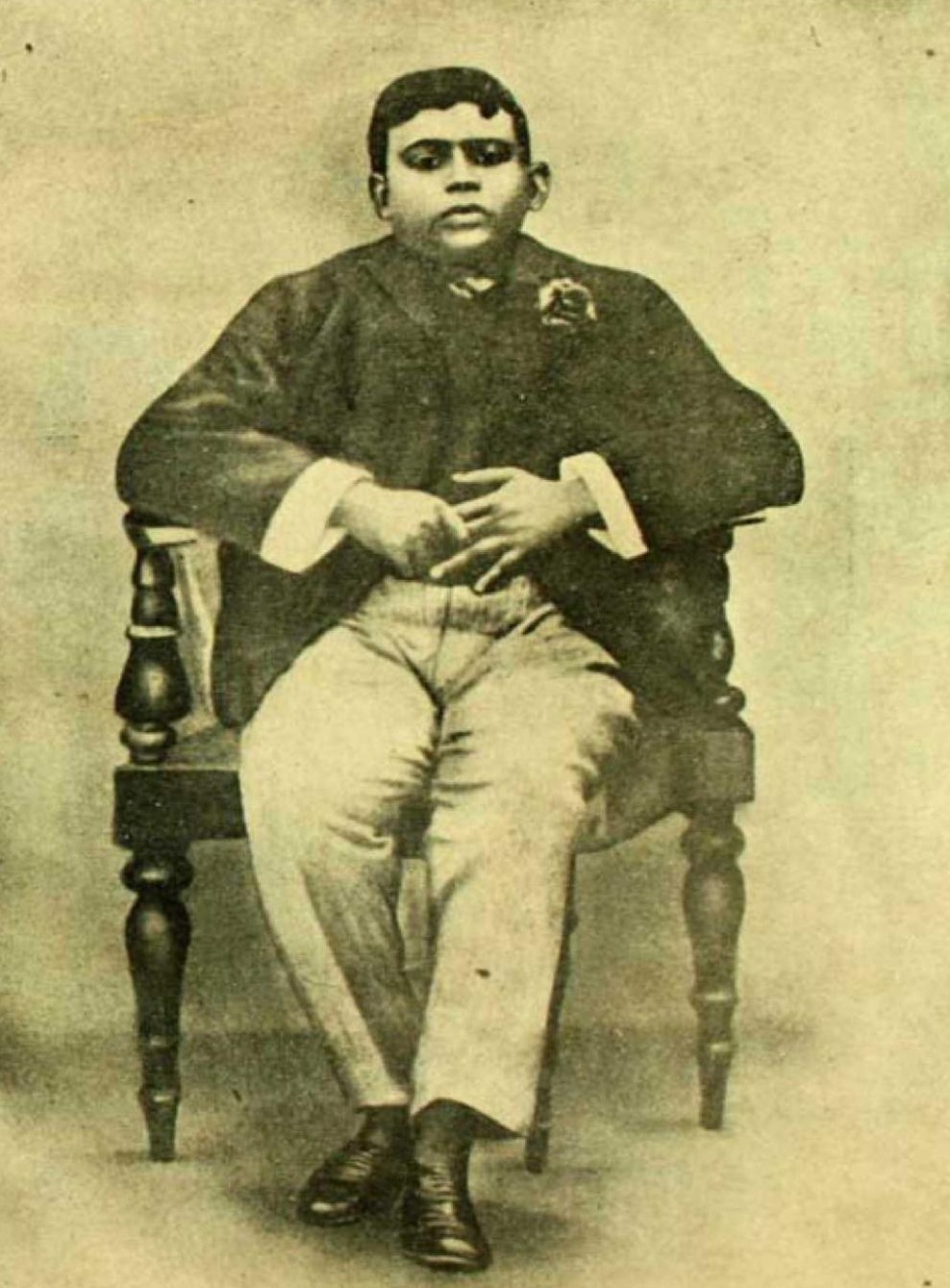
- Harinath De: Indian linguist, polyglot, Indologist and an academician
- Born: 12 August 1877; Ariadaha, Calcutta North 24 Parganas, West Bengal, India
- Died: 30 August 1911 (aged 34); Calcutta, India
- Occupations: Academician, librarian, polyglot
- Known for: ability to speak in 34 languages

Harinath De (12 August 1877 – 30 August 1911) was an Indian linguist, polyglot, Indologist and an academician, who later became the first Indian librarian of the National Library of India (then Imperial Library) from 1907 to 1911. In a life span of thirty-four years, he learned 34 languages.

== Early life and education ==
He was born in Ariadaha of Kamarhati (in present North 24 Parganas district) near Kolkata, West Bengal. His father Roy Bahadur Bhutnath De was a government official in Raipur, Central Provinces (now Chhattisgarh), where the family of young Narendranath Dutta (future Swami Vivekananda) also stayed in the same building, briefly from 1877 to 1879.

He attended Raipur High School, and went to study at Presidency College, Kolkata (then in the University of Calcutta), followed by Christ's College, Cambridge A polyglot and linguistic prodigy, he was expert in 34 languages, including many eastern and western languages such as Chinese, Tibetan, Pali, Sanskrit, Persian, Arabic, English, Greek, Latin, out of which he was M.A in 14.

== Career ==
De was the first Indian Education Service officer among Indians. He was Professor of English of Dhaka University and of Presidency College, Kolkata. He was appointed the first lecturer of the newly created department of Linguistics of Calcutta University in 1907. He was appointed the second librarian and first Indian librarian of the Imperial Library, after the death of John Macfarlane, who was previously Assistant Librarian of the British Museum, London, who was the first librarian of the newly merged Imperial Library.

== Literary career ==
In 1902 He published a new edition of Macaulay's Essay on Milton. In 1903 he edited and published a new version of Palgrave's Golden Treasury. Then he translated Rihla, the travelogue written by Ibn Battuta and Jalaluddin Abu Zafar Muhammad's book Al-fakhri to English. He also worked on Arabic grammar.

The most important works of him included an English–Persian lexicon, translation of a part of Rig Veda with original slokas, editing of Lankabatar Sutra, Nirbanbyakhya Shastram, etc. He also translated a few Sanskrit plays to English like Vasavdatta of Subandhu and Abhigyan Shakuntalam of Kalidasa.

His works, 88 volumes on literature, linguistics and Hinduism, are now part of the National Library of India, known as the Harinath Dey Collection.

== Death ==
He died of typhoid on 30 August 1911 at the age of 34.

== Works ==
- Select Papers, Mainly Indological, compiled and edited by Sunil Bandyopadhyay. Sanskrit Pustak Bhandar, 1972.
