= College of Medicine & Sagore Dutta Hospital =

Government Medical College and tertiary referral hospital in Kolkata, India

College of Medicine and Sagore Dutta Hospital
- Motto: तमसो मा ज्योतिर्गमय(Sanskrit) (Tamaso mā jyotirgamaya)
- Motto in English: From darkness, lead me to light
- Recognition: NMC; INC
- Type: Public Medical College and Hospital
- Established: August 5, 2010; 16 years ago
- Academic affiliations: West Bengal University of Health Sciences
- Principal: Dr. Parthapratim Pradhan
- Students: 150 per year(MBBS) M.D.- 40+ • DMLT–30 • DRD–10 • DPT–5 • DCCT–10 • D.OPT–5 • DOTT–5 • ECG–5 per year (Paramedical)
- Location: Kamarhati, North 24 Parganas, West Bengal, 700058, India; 22.675°N 88.374°E
- Campus: Urban
- Website: www.comsdh.org.in

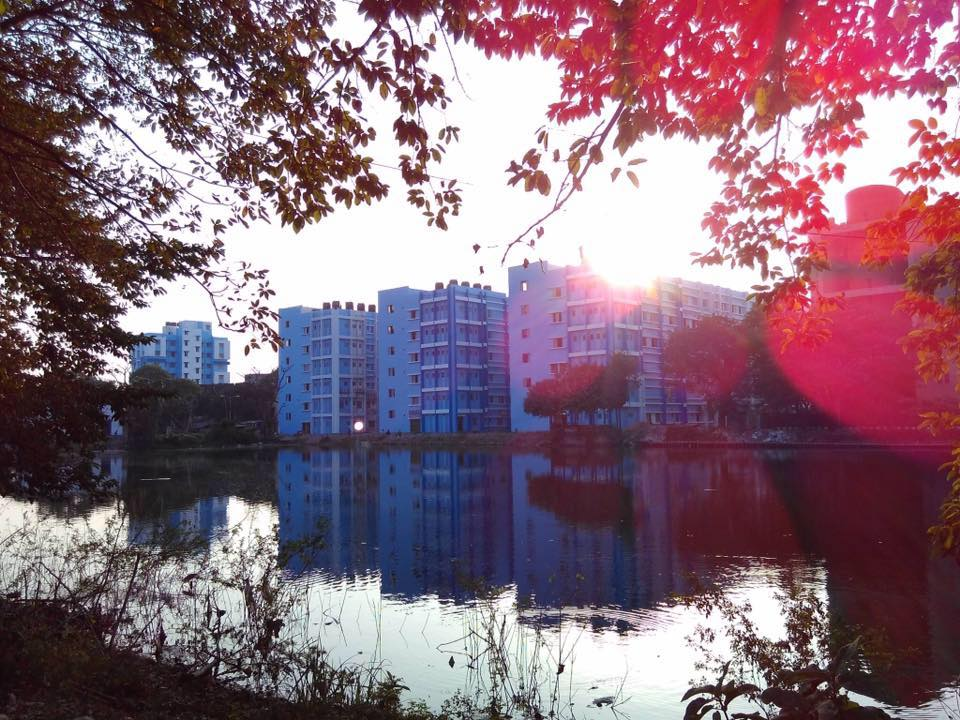
Hospital Buildings of CMSDH

College of Medicine & Sagore Dutta Hospital (CMSDH), also known as Sagar Dutta Medical College, is a tertiary referral government hospital, medical college and research institute in the state of West Bengal, India. It is situated at Kamarhati, in the suburbs of Kolkata. It has been set up by the Government of West Bengal on 5 August 2010 and started M.B.B.S. courses from 2011 to reduce the shortfall of doctors in the state. Nursing and other Paramedical courses (under State Medical Faculty of West Bengal) are also offered. It is affiliated to the West Bengal University of Health Sciences and recognised by National Medical Commission.

== History ==
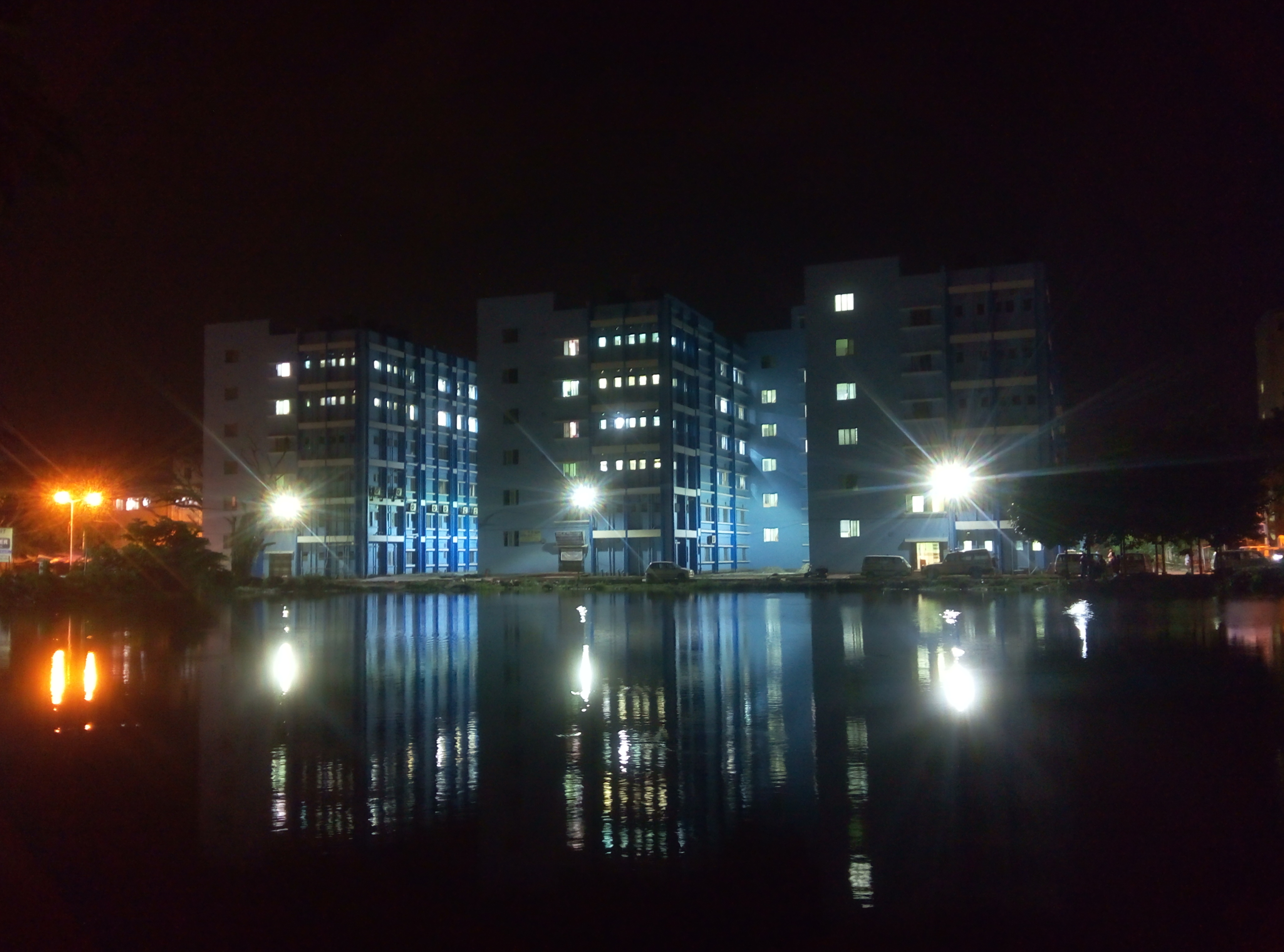
CMSDH Night View

Sagore Dutt Charitable Hospital and Dispensary initially started as a philanthropic organization with an objective of all round health care of the poor peasants and industrial workers of Kamarhati and adjoining areas. Its immense service to fulfill the objectives was recognized when the Medical Secretary, Dr. Anderson, on his India tour, visited ‘a rural hospital and dispensary situated outside Calcutta, the Sagore Dutt Charitable Hospital and Dispensary’ in January, 1937. The institute was taken over by the Government of West Bengal when it passed the Sagore Dutt Hospital Act, 1958.

Considering the dearth of medical professionals in West Bengal with the Doctor:Population ratio of 1:2600, Government of West Bengal decided to start a new medical college with a capacity of 100 MBBS students, in a strategic location of Kamarhati, which is the gateway of North Kolkata. In 2010, the Government of West Bengal issued a memo in which a sanction was accorded to set up a medical college, with an intake of 100 MBBS students, in the campus of the Sagore Dutt Hospital.

After the inspection by M.C.I. team in 2011, Letter of Permission was received by the Authority of College of Medicine & Sagore Dutta Hospital on 30 June of the same year. Classes for the first year M.B.B.S. course commenced on 1 August 2011. The college has received recognition for all M.B.B.S. degrees granted on or after February, 2016.

The DMLT and DRD courses started in the Academic Year 2014–15. The DPT, DOPT, DOTT and ECG courses started from 2015. The DCCT course was started from 2016.

The Post Graduate courses started in 2019, thus becoming the first college in West Bengal established after 2005 to provide Post Graduate courses.

== Campus ==
=== Location ===
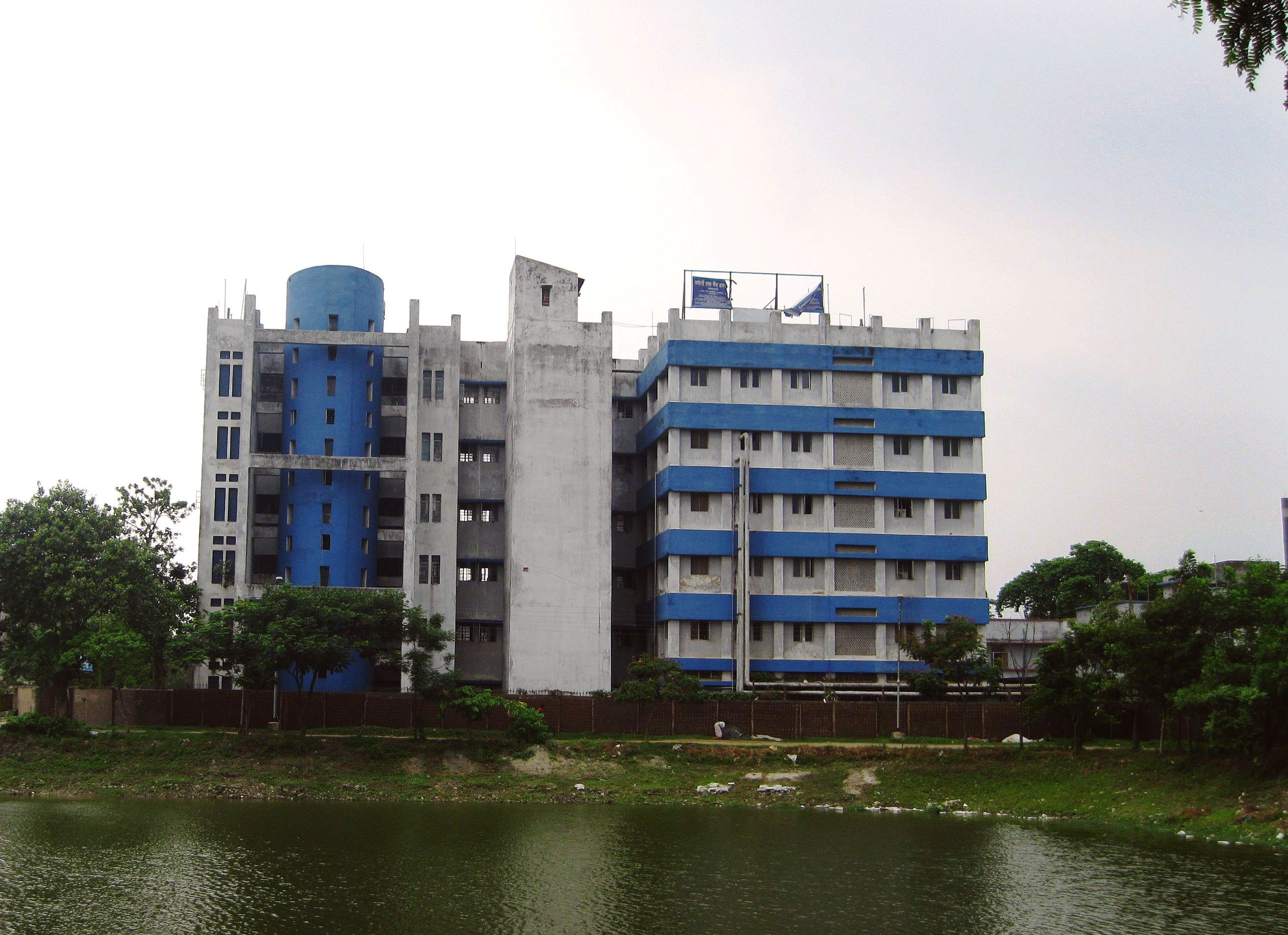
ESI Hospital, Kamarhati

Located near Kamarhati bus terminus on B.T. Road, the College of Medicine and Sagore Dutta Hospital is adjacent to the Kamarhati E.S.I. Hospital. Kamarhati is a city and a municipality under Belghoria police station of Barrackpore subdivision in North 24 Parganas district in the Indian state of West Bengal. It is a part of the area covered by Kolkata Metropolitan Development Authority. Kamarhati is located at 22.67°N 88.37°E, a part of the urban agglomeration of the metropolis of Kolkata. The sacred temple of Dakshineshwar is situated in Kamarhati Municipal area. Towns like Belgharia and Ariadaha are part of Kamarhati.

The nearest airport (Netaji Subhas Chandra Bose International Airport) is located 12 km away and the nearest railway station (Agarpara railway station) is located 2.2 km away.

=== Infrastructure ===
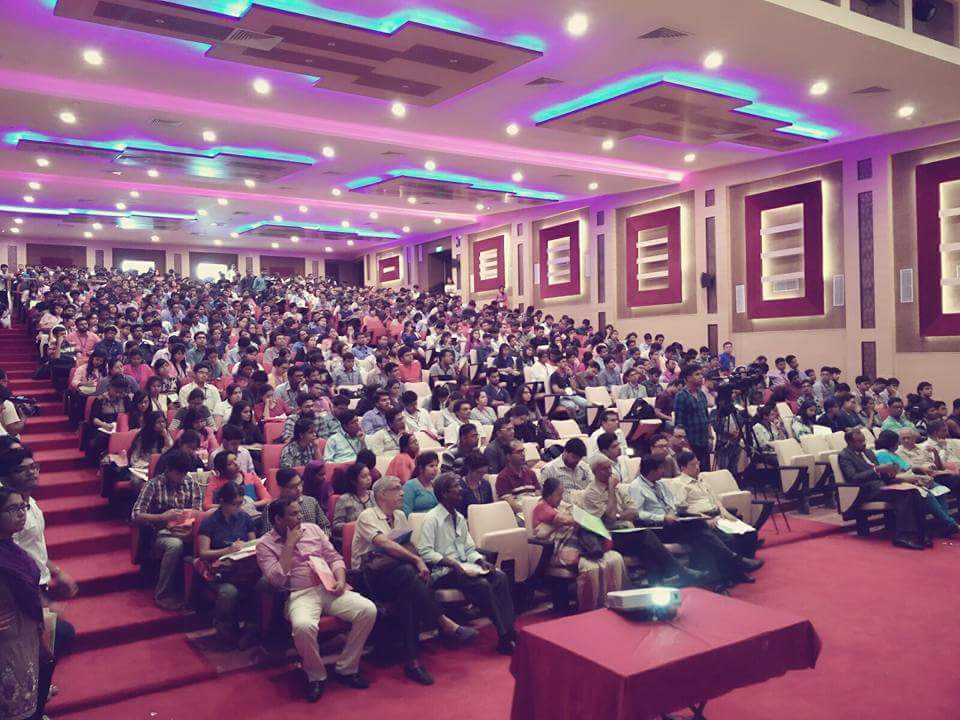
CMSDH Auditorium during SASICME 2016

- The total campus area is 17.63 acres.
- The eight-storey academic building houses the central library, lecture theatres, demonstration rooms and practical laboratories along with the auditorium and the morgue.
- The six-storey hospital buildings has 500 beds and 11 O.T.s.
- The buildings have been constructed at a cost of Rs. 100 crore with modern facilities and emergency safety features.
- The old hospital building has been renovated and has become the new OPD building. OPD timings are from 10 A.M. to 2 P.M.
- The Central Library in the new academic building houses a 7500 books along with 80 foreign journals and has high-speed internet facility for e-library facility.
- Hospital Blood Bank and Fair price medicine shop is present.
- Separate hostels for boys and girls with option for availing cable broadband internet.
- Separate Hostel for Interns.
- The three canteens serve both veg and non-veg foods of various types.
- Residential quarters for teachers and staffs.
- A Rs. 40 crore tertiary cancer care centre is under construction, the first of its kind in a state-run medical college of West Bengal.
- Nursing college with attached hostel.

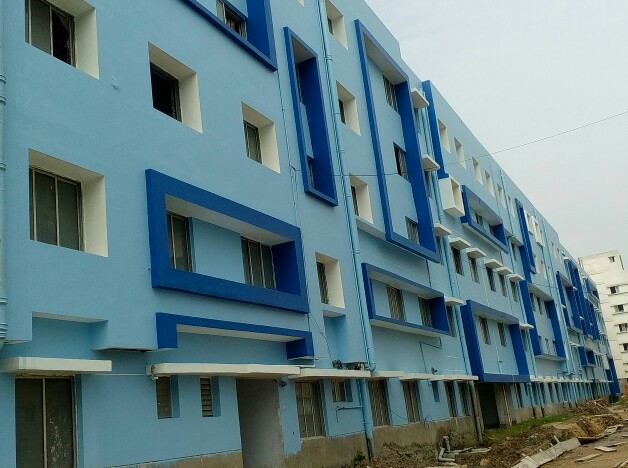
CMSDH Students' Hostel

The campus area is owned by the Health Department of Government of West Bengal. It includes the following:

- 3 water ponds
- New OPD Building
- New Academic Building
- New Hospital buildings
- Students Hostel Block
- Interns Hostel
- Nursing college
- Residential Quarters

== Academics ==
=== Academic programmes ===
Under Graduate:

- MBBS (4.5 years course + 1 year Compulsory Rotatory Internship)

Post Graduate:

- M.D. Pharmacology
- M.D. Biochemistry
- M.D. Community Medicine
- M.S. Ophthalmology
- M.D. Anaesthesiology
- M.S. Obstetrics and Gynaecology
- M.D. Pediatrics
- M.D. Psychiatry
- M.D. Chest Medicine
- M.D. Medicine
- M.D. Pathology

Diploma:

- DCCT - Diploma in Critical Care Technology
- DMLT (Tech) - Diploma in Medical Lab Technology
- DRD (Tech) - Diploma in Radiology
- DOPT - Diploma in Optometry with Ophthalmic Technique
- DOTT - Diploma in Operation Theatre Technology

=== Admission ===
Admission to the MBBS course was undertaken by W.B.M.C.C.. Earlier, admission was according to the rank list of the West Bengal Joint Entrance Examination (WBJEE) and All India Pre Medical Test (AIPMT), the latter accounting for 15% of the seats. The admission of the 2013 batch and all batches from 2017 onwards is now based on the National Eligibility cum Entrance Test (Undergraduate) (NEET-UG) rank list.

Admission to Diploma courses is undertaken by S.M.F.W.B. according to marks obtained in Physics, Chemistry and Biology in SMFWBEE.

Admission to the Post Graduate courses are based on NEET-PG rank list.

== Departments ==
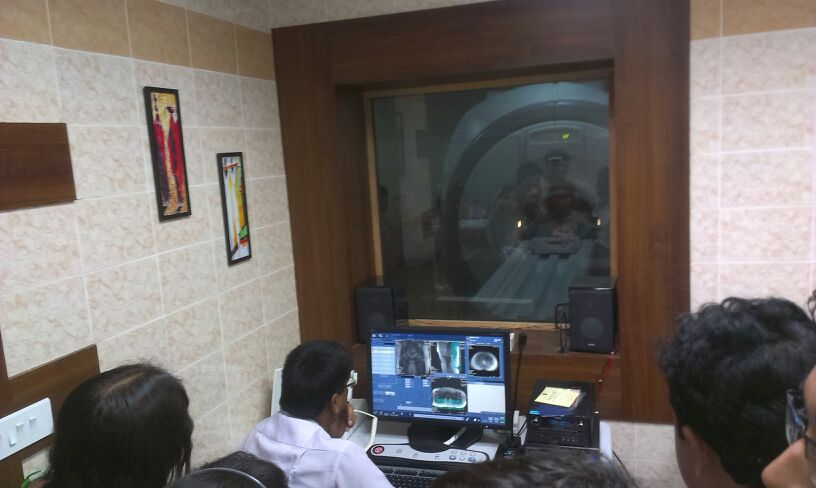
MRI Console room at CMSDH

The following departments are present in the medical college:

- Department of Anesthesiology
- Department of Anatomy
- Department of Biochemistry
- Department of Chest Medicine
- Department of Community Medicine
- Department of Dermatology
- Department of Dental Surgery
- Department of E.N.T.
- Department of Forensic Medicine
- Department of General Medicine
- Department of General Surgery
- Department of Gynecology & Obstetrics
- Department of Microbiology
- Department of Ophthalmology
- Department of Orthopedics
- Department of Pathology
- Department of Pediatric Medicine
- Department of Pharmacology
- Department of Physical Medicine
- Department of Physiology
- Department of Psychiatry
- Department of Radiodiagnosis
- Department of Radiotherapy

== Student life ==
- Asterica - The annual college fest, spanning six days including the Pre Fest Events, consisting of various programmes and performances by noted artists.
- Alfresco - Fresher's welcome programme to welcome the new batch of students.
- Asydoc- Convocation programme of the MBBS passing batch
- Novella - The annual college fest of all paramedical students
- Pratyay - Annual Magazine
- Ritam Mukherjee Smriti Cup - Intra-college Football League
- Sagore Dutta Premier League - Intra-college Cricket League
- Saraswati puja
- Rabindra Jayanti
- International Mother Language Day
- Foundation Day
- Teachers' Day
- Teachers vs. Students Cricket Match
