= Oh! Lovely =

2023 Bengali film

- Release poster Created : Shuvro Mamun
- Directed by: Haranath Chakraborty
- Written by: Sudeep Das
- Produced by: Sandeep Sathi
- Starring: Rajnandini Paul; Madan Mitra; Kharaj Mukherjee; Laboni Sarkar
- Cinematography: Ishwar Barik
- Edited by: Sujay Datta Ray
- Music by: Songs: Suvam-Subhankar; Score: S P Venkatesh
- Distributed by: Surinder Films
- Release date: 25 August 2023
- Running time: 115 minutes
- Country: India
- Language: Bengali

Oh! Lovely is a 2023 Indian Bengali romantic drama film directed by Haranath Chakraborty. This is the debut film of Bengali politician Madan Mitra. This film was released on 25 August 2023 under the banner of Sathi Films.

== Plot ==
It is the story of a village boy Sayantan alias Santu whose father is a rich farmer Ramanikanta. Ramanikanta supplies rice to another businessman Subimal. Santu is willing to go Kolkata for job instead of looking after his father's well established business. During the interview he meets an orphan girl Nidhi and they fall in love and decide to marry each other.

== Cast ==
- Rajnandini Paul as Nidhi
- Rik Chatterjee as Santu
- Madan Mitra as Subimal
- Kharaj Mukherjee as Ramanikanta
- Laboni Sarkar Santu's mother
- Dron Mukherjee
- Kaushik Bhattacharya
- Buddhadeb Bhattacharya
- Tapati Munsi
- Mrinmoy Das

== Soundtrack ==
The music of the film has been composed by Suvam - Subhankar.

Track listing
No.	Title	Lyrics	Singer(s)	Length
1.	"Toke Niye Bilet Jabo Re"	Dipangshu Acharya	Subhankar Dey, Ankita Bhattacharyya	3:47
2.	"Mayabi Thikanay"	Dipangshu Acharya	Sonu Nigam	3:40
3.	"Baby Hebbi Hyalu Hoye Jai"	Dipangshu Acharya	Subhankar Dey	4:22
4.	"Toke Dekhe Uru Uru"	Gautam Susmit	Subhankar Dey, Ankita Bhattacharyya	3:33
5.	"Mono Pakhi"	Soham Majumdar	Krishna Beuraa	4:49
Total length:				20:11

== Reception ==
The film was reviewed by Anandabazar Patrika and Aaro Ananda.
