= Manash Mukherjee =

Indian politician

Member of West Bengal Legislative Assembly
- In office 19 May 2016 – 2 May 2021
- Preceded by: Madan Mitra
- Succeeded by: Madan Mitra
- Constituency: Kamarhati
- In office 13 May 2001 – 13 May 2011
- Preceded by: Santi Ghatak
- Succeeded by: Madan Mitra
- Constituency: Kamarhati

Personal details
- Born: 12 April 1954 (age 72)
- Party: Communist Party of India (Marxist)
- Occupation: Politician

Manash Mukherjee is an Indian politician belonging to the Communist Party of India (Marxist) and former Member of West Bengal Legislative Assembly from 2001 to 2011 and 2016 to 2021, representing Kamarhati (Vidhan Sabha constituency).
