= Sampurna (TV series) =

Indian Bengali social drama series

- Release poster
- Genre: Social Drama
- Written by: Anuja Chatterjee; Soumyabrata Rakshit
- Screenplay by: Anuja Chatterjee
- Directed by: Sayantan Ghosal
- Starring: Sohini Sarkar; Rajnandini Paul; Anubhav Kanjilal; Prantik Chaterjee
- Theme music composer: Amit–Ishan
- Composer: Amit–Ishan
- Country of origin: India
- Original language: Bengali
- No. of seasons: 2
- No. of episodes: 12

Production
- Executive producer: Sourav Ghosh
- Producers: Sayantan Ghosal; Subhadeep Ghosh; Soumya Mukherjee; Soumyabrata Rakhsit
- Production location: Kolkata
- Cinematography: Pravatendu Mondal
- Editor: Subhajit Singha
- Camera setup: Single-camera
- Running time: 18-28 minutes
- Production companies: Follow Focus Films; Shree Venkatesh Films

Original release
- Release: 2022 – present

Sampurna is an Indian Bengali social drama web series streaming on Hoichoi. Directed by Sayantan Ghosal, the series has been written by Anuja Chatterjee along with Soumyabrata Rakshit. Produced by Follow Focus Films and Shree Venkatesh Films, the series deals with the themes of marital rape against a woman and unequal consent for the female counterpart in a marriage.

The series stars Sohini Sarkar in the titular role of "Sampurna". She plays the role of a woman who fights to protect her sister-in-law from marital rape, a largely unrecognised issue in the society. Rajnandini Paul plays a parallel lead while Anubhav Kanjilal and Prantik Chatterjee play other pivotal roles. Pravatendu Mondal did the cinematography while Subhajit Singha handled the editing. Two seasons of the series has been released and they are streaming on the Bengali OTT platform "Hoichoi".

== Overview ==
Sampurna revolves around two sister-in-laws, Nandini and Sampurna, whose lives fall into turmoil due to domestic violence. Nandini's new marriage turns into a nightmare for her, as husband Raktim abused her sexually. She becomes a victim of marital rape as she is forced to engage in sexual activity with her husband, without her consent. Raktim's parents gives more priority to their social image, instead of helping Nandini. Raktim's mother fails to recognise her son's fault and blames it on Raktim and Nandini's non-matching kundli. Aggrieved by Nandini's suffering, Sampurna takes on the task to help Nandini come out of the traumatic cycle of marital rape.

The second season primarily focuses on Sampurna's traumatic past, where she has been a victim of molestation by her maternal uncle. To help Nandini, she seeks help from her maternal uncle Hirak Lahiri, a renowned lawyer. He resolves Nandini's marital rape issue through legal procedure. But his presence triggers back the childhood trauma in Sampurna, which she had kept secret for so many years. Her uncle had molested her while she was a teenager. Besides fighting for Nandini, she also fights for herself in an unequal battle against her uncle, who outpowers her using his economic strength and social outreach.

== Cast ==
- Sohini Sarkar as Sampurna, elder daughter-in-law of Sanyals
- Rajnandini Paul as Nandini, younger daughter-in-law of Sanyals
- Anubhav Kanjilal as Raktim a.k.a. Ruku, Nandini's husband
- Prantik Chaterjee as Pratim a.k.a. Piku, Sampurna's husband
- Rajat Ganguly as Debotosh Sanyal, Raktim and Pratim's father
- Laboni Sarkar as Aloka Sanyal, Raktim and Pratim's mother
- Kaushik Sen as Hirak Lahiri, a lawyer and Sampurna's maternal uncle
- Paromita Mukherjee as Pritha Dutta, a police officer
- Manasi Sinha as Sampurna's mother
- Bhaswar Chatterjee as Sampurna's brother
- Arijita Mukherjee as an advocate
- Pradeepto Ray as Biswas Babu, the Sanyals' neighbour

== Episodes ==
| Series | Episodes | Originally released |
|---|---|---|
| 1 | 6 | 29 July 2022 |
| 2 | 6 | 29 September 2023 |

=== Season 1 (2022) ===
| No. | Title | Directed by | Written by | Original release date |
|---|---|---|---|---|
| 1 | "Utsaber Sheshey" | Sayantan Ghosal | Anuja Chattopadhyay, Soumyabrata Rakshit | July 29, 2022 |
| 2 | "Swapnobhongo" | Sayantan Ghosal | Anuja Chattopadhyay, Soumyabrata Rakshit | July 29, 2022 |
| 3 | "Bawjropat" | Sayantan Ghosal | Anuja Chattopadhyay, Soumyabrata Rakshit | July 29, 2022 |
| 4 | "Sanghat" | Sayantan Ghosal | Anuja Chattopadhyay, Soumyabrata Rakshit | July 29, 2022 |
| 5 | "Nirbashita" | Sayantan Ghosal | Anuja Chattopadhyay, Soumyabrata Rakshit | July 29, 2022 |
| 6 | "Juddho Shuru" | Sayantan Ghosal | Anuja Chattopadhyay, Soumyabrata Rakshit | July 29, 2022 |

=== Season 2 (2023) ===
| No. | Title | Directed by | Written by | Original release date |
|---|---|---|---|---|
| 1 | "Duswapno" | Sayantan Ghosal | Anuja Chattopadhyay, Soumyabrata Rakshit | September 29, 2023 |
| 2 | "Noshto Otit" | Sayantan Ghosal | Anuja Chattopadhyay, Soumyabrata Rakshit | September 29, 2023 |
| 3 | "Joy Porajoy" | Sayantan Ghosal | Anuja Chattopadhyay, Soumyabrata Rakshit | September 29, 2023 |
| 4 | "Atonko" | Sayantan Ghosal | Anuja Chattopadhyay, Soumyabrata Rakshit | September 29, 2023 |
| 5 | "Sommukh Somor" | Sayantan Ghosal | Anuja Chattopadhyay, Soumyabrata Rakshit | September 29, 2023 |
| 6 | "Protisodh" | Sayantan Ghosal | Anuja Chattopadhyay, Soumyabrata Rakshit | September 29, 2023 |

== Production ==
=== Announcement and development ===
"It is very difficult to get into the dark space of a sex offender. More so, when the perpetrator has no idea about the wrongdoing. My character is not exactly a villain. Raktim loves his wife. He wants to save his marriage. He doesn’t want anyone to interfere in a matter that he thinks is ‘personal’. And yet he rapes his wife. He has no idea of the gravity of his action."

— Anubhav Kanjilal, sharing his experience about his character.

The second season of Sampurna was announced in early 2023, at the seventh slate of "Hoichoi" announcements in early 2023.

The first look pictures of Sohini Sarkar and Prantik Banerjee from their wedding sequence in the second season were released on 11 August 2023.

=== Pre production ===
Sohini Sarkar mentioned in an interview with ABP Ananda that she said "yes" to her role in Sampurna after hearing the script the first time. She also said that she believes, women should readily agree for such web series which serves a social message through it, specially regarding sensuous and less spoken matters like marital rape.

== Marketing ==
The trailer of the first season was released on 22 July 2022. The trailer of the second season was released on 16 September 2023.

== Release ==
The first season of Sampurna was streamed on "Hoichoi" on 29 July 2022. The second season was streamed on "Hoichoi" on 29 September 2023.

== Reception ==
=== Critical reception ===
==== Season 1 ====
Shamayita Chakraborty of OTTplay rated the series 4/5 stars and opined "Sampurna is a must-watch. It is a reality check for all of us in society. It brings up real questions about the legal system that refuses to recognise marital rape as a criminal offence." She praised the simplicity and relatability of the series, the performance of the actors, the picturisation of the society where many men think their wife is their personal property and they need to not ask their wives' "consent" for having sex. But she criticized the colour palette, weak animation, the overstretched ten minutes segment in the last episode, the long scenes throughout and the sloppy dialogues.

Poorna Banerjee of The Times of India rated the series 3/5 stars and wrote "Tackling a subject as sensitive as marital rape with a strong female-centric narrative is not an easy task, but Sayantan Ghosal tries to weave a believable plot that slowly stretches across the span of six episodes." She praised the pace of the episodes, the weight put on the topic, the melodramatic background score, and the bonding between Sampurna and Nandini. But she bemoaned the weak dialogues in certain parts and mentioned that sometimes, it became traumatizing to watch owing to the director's excess focus on such a sensual topic like marital trape.

Lubaba Mahjabin Prima of The Daily Star reviewed the series and worded "The show reminds us that even the people closest to us can be monsters, and that no matter what, marriage never equals consent." She praised the core message of the series, strong dialogues, the storyline, background score but bemoaned the not so good editing and cinematography.

Archi Sengupta of Leisure Byte rated the series 4/5 and wrote "The 6-episode series is a gripping watch. Marital rape is such a difficult subject matter that Indians don’t really believe it to be an issue. Our cultures and our reputations in society are much more important than a young woman’s comfort, privacy and health – Sampurna might just make you introspect a little." She praised the bonding between Sampurna and Nandini, the discomforting reality maintained throughout the series and the gripping storyline.

==== Season 2 ====
Archi Sengupta of Leisure Byte rated the second season of Sampurna 3/5 stars and wrote "Sampurna 2 is quite watchable and might also be traumatising, but it lacks that charm and fear of watching two very normal people fighting against injustices in their own homes and against people who are also as normal as them." She praised the handling of such a sensitive topic, and Sohini and Rajnandini's performance but criticised the melodrama, cliched all powerful portrayal of the uncle, the half baked connection with the first part, less relatability and charm compared to the first part and the rushed up ending.

=== Audience reception ===
The first season of Sampurna emerged as the most viewed show on "Hoichoi" in a single month; in August 2022.

== Remake ==
JioHotstar bought the remake rights of the series for the Hindi remake. Sampurna became the first Bengali web series to be remade in Hindi. The series Chiraiya was streamed on JioHotstar, on 20 March 2026.
