= Rajnandini Paul =

Indian actress (born 1999)

- Born: 6 July 1999 (age 27); Kolkata, West Bengal, India
- Occupation: Actress
- Years active: 2018–present
- Parents: Indrani Dutta (mother); Janardan Paul (father)

Rajnandini Paul (born 6 July 1999) is an Indian actress who works primarily in Bengali cinema and streaming productions. She made her screen debut in Uronchondi (2018) and has since appeared in Ek Je Chhilo Raja (2018), Asur (2020), Oh! Lovely (2023) and Chhaad - The Terrace (2024).

In OTT, Paul earned critical attention for the social‑drama series Sampurna (2022–23). Her subsequent OTT projects include the Mahalaya special Mahishasuramardini (2024) and Puro Puri Eken (2025).

== Early life and education ==
Paul was born and raised in Kolkata. The daughter of Odissi exponent and actor Indrani Dutta, she trained in classical dance forms before graduating in English literature from the University of Calcutta.

== Career ==
=== Film ===
Paul’s debut performance in Uronchondi (2018) was praised for its naturalism. Following it, she appeared in cameo roles in Srijit Mukherji’s period drama Ek Je Chhilo Raja and Pavel’s art thriller Asur. She played the female lead in Haranath Chakraborty’s comedy film Oh! Lovely (2023) and played a young urban professional in Indrani Chakraborty’s Chhaad (2024).

As of September 2025, Paul has two upcoming projects: Ram Kamal Mukherjee’s slice‑of‑life film Lakshmikantapur Local, which entered post‑production in April 2025 and Mainak Bhaumik’s comic‑book adaptation Rappa Roy o Full Stop Dot Com.

=== Web series ===
Paul’s digital breakthrough came with Sampurna (2022–23) on Hoichoi. In 2023, she paired opposite Ritwick Chakraborty in the adventure mystery series Mr Kolketa, streamed on Hoichoi. She next portrayed Devi Durga in Mahishasuramardini (2024), which marked the first Mahalaya show to be aired on OTT. In January 2025 she joined the detective‑comedy franchise Eken Babu as a Kathakali dancer Paramita in its eighth season Puro Puri Eken.

== Filmography ==
Key
†	Denotes films that have not yet been released

=== Films ===
Year	Title	Role	Notes	Ref.
2018	Uronchondi	Paromita	Debut	
2018	Ek Je Chhilo Raja	Chandrabati Devi	Cameo	
2020	Asur	Durga		
2021	Lockdown	Episodic appearance	Anthology	
2023	Oh! Lovely	Nidhi		
2024	Chhaad	Sohini		
2024	Tahader Kotha	Sushmita		
2025	Lokkhikantopur Local	Tiyasa		
2026	Vijaynagar'er Hirey	Kasturidevi Raya		

=== Television ===
Year	Title	Role	Network	Production Company (s)	Notes	Ref.
2025–2026	Rajrajeshwari Rani Bhabani	Rani Bhabani	Star Jalsha	Bangla Talkies	Debut in television soap opera	

=== Web series ===
Year	Title	Platform	Role	Notes	Ref.
2022–23	Sampurna	Hoichoi	Nandini Sanyal	Parallel lead (Season 1 and 2)	
2023	Mr Kolketa	Hoichoi	Jhelum Sen	Lead	
2024	Mahishasuramardini	Hoichoi	Devi Durga / Mahamaya		
2025	Puro Puri Eken	Hoichoi	Paramita	Eken Babu Season 8	

== Awards ==
Year	Title	Category	Role	Show
2025	Telly Academy Awards 2025	Best Debutant	Rani Bhabani	[[Rajarajeshwari Rani Bhabani]]

== See also ==
- Cinema of West Bengal
- List of Indian actresses
