= Ariadaha =

- Neighbourhood
- Location West Bengal, India Ariadaha (West Bengal) Ariadaha (India)
- Coordinates: 22.6674°N 88.3672°E
- Country: India
- State: West Bengal
- Division: Presidency
- District: North 24 Parganas

Government
  - Type: Municipality
  - Body: Kamarhati Municipality
- Elevation: 15 m (49 ft)

Languages
  - Official: Bengali, English
- Time zone: UTC+5:30 (IST)
- PIN: 700057
- Telephone code: +91 33
- Vehicle registration: WB
- Lok Sabha constituency: Dum Dum
- Vidhan Sabha constituency: Kamarhati

Ariadaha is a neighbourhood in Kamarhati of North 24 Parganas district in the Indian state of West Bengal. It is a part of the area covered by Kolkata Metropolitan Development Authority (KMDA).

== History ==
Ariadaha-Dakshineswar situated close to North Kolkata carries a glorious past in the Bengal Renaissance that still remains largely unacknowledged in the mainstream historical accounts. Once it was under the jurisdiction of Calcutta (Kolkata) District. Within 24 Parganas, Kolkata was one of the Parganas and Ariadaha-Dakshineswar was under it. Like other ancient parts of Rarh Banga (adivision of ancient South Bengal) this place was full of the ancient inhabitants of Bengal like the Hanri, Dome, Nishad, Kahar who originated from the Proto-Australoids according to Anthropology. Other casts like the Brahmans, Kayesthas and the Vaidyas etc. entered later. However, with the tide of time a mixed culture grows and inherited by the peoples of this region though there were two groups of people were in the frontline of the cultural scenario. One was liberal and other was certainly conservative. The conservatives constituted the most powerful sections of society with the liberals lagging behind as their opposition could hardly cause flutter in the orthodox socio-cultural matrix. The scenario did not show any significant change even after the introduction of colonial British education and culture in this region as happened in the other parts of old Calcutta. During the last half of 15th century, from almost about 1690 A.D., Kolkata began to reorient itself towards colonial culture under the leadership and colonial tutelage of Job Charnak. But little did change in the region of Ariadaha-Dakshineswar—the old society beset with inhuman superstitious practices. Ariadaha-Dakshineswar as a part of old Calcutta as it witnessed a cultural interface between both conservative and liberal forces. From the medieval period, highly educated and economically enriched families began to enter this region (Ariadaha-Dakshineswar), effecting significant changes in the socio-economic patterns.

Ariadaha-Dakshineswar was primarily the motherland of highly educated middle class. One of the janapadas (a big unit of 20 or more villages in ancient India) of Calcutta could not become a big city and that was Dakshineswar (Sen: 2004). Famous Historian Martin mentioned Dakshineswar as the Capital of Bengal (Mullick: 1403, Bengali Year). The cultural sphere of Ariadaha-Dakshineswar was patronized and encouraged by the Maharajas the regional rulers of Krishnanagar of Nadia. The educated liberals were in the leading part of the protest movement by the Vaishnavas, Shaivas and Shaktas against the Brahmanism. Thus a new line of thought spread across this area. One of the opinions regarding the origin of the name of Calcutta was the word Kalikhetra and it denotes the place from Kalighat to Dakshineswar (Dey: 1989).

== Education ==
=== Schools ===
- Ariadaha Girls High School
- Ariahada Kalachand High School
- Ariadaha Ramanand Charity Vidyalaya
- Ariahada Sarbamangala Balika Vidyalaya
- Ariadaha Sree Vidyaniketan high school
- Dakshineswar bharati bhawan girls high school
- Dakshineswar High School
- Dakshineswar Sri Sri Sarada Devi Balika Vidyamandir
- Sri Satyananda Sikhyamandir (Nursery & Primary School)

=== Colleges ===
- Adyapeath Annada BEd College
- Adyapeath Annada Polytechnic College (Govt. Spns.)
- Hiralal Majumdar Memorial College For Women

== Hospitals ==
- Baranagar Matri Sadan Hospital
- Bindu Devi Charitable Hospital
- Sri Ramakrishna Matri Mangal pratisthan, Ariadaha

== Location ==
Ariadaha-Dakshineswar is situated 22040'0 North latitude and 88022'0 East longitude and 11 kilometers away from Chowringhee, under the jurisdiction of Kamarhati Municipality (Malley: 2009) now. Today if we draw a borderline on four sides of it, we can see Kumarhatta (now Kamarhati), another ancient settlement is situated on its north, Nowdapara, Another undivided area of Ariadaha, on Northeast, Dakshineswar, Alambazar-Baranagar on its south, Belgharia-Rathtala along with Dantia Canal (a branch of Upper Bagjola Canal) and BT Road on the east and the Hooghly River on the west.

== Memorable places ==
=== Temples ===
- Adyapeath Temple
- Ariadaha Muktakeshi Kalibari
- Ariadaha Path Bari
- Bindhyabasini Temple
- Dakshineswar Temple

=== River Side ===
- Sukhada Debi (Battala) Ghat
- Char Mandir Ghat
- Sarat Ghosal Ghat
- Satish Ch. Basu Mallik (Garan) Ghat
- Ariadaha Patbari Ghat
- Ariahada Ferry Ghat
- Ariadaha Burning Ghat
- Ariadaha Madhusudan Ray Ghat

== Transportation ==
Few buses ply along D.D. Mondal Ghat Road-A.C. Sarkar Road-Kumud Ghosal Road-M.M. Feeder Road. The Ariadaha bus-stand is on A.C. Banerjee Road which is connected to Kumud Ghosal Road.

=== Bus ===
==== Private ====
- DN2 Dakshineswar - Barasat

==== Mini ====
- S181 Ariadaha - Babughat

==== WBTC ====
- S17A Ariadaha - Kudghat
- S57 Ariadaha - Nabanna

=== Railway ===
The nearest railway stations of Ariadaha are Dakshineswar railway station and Baranagar Road railway station.

=== Ferry Service ===
- Ariadaha - Uttarpara
