= Dakshineswar =

- Neighbourhood
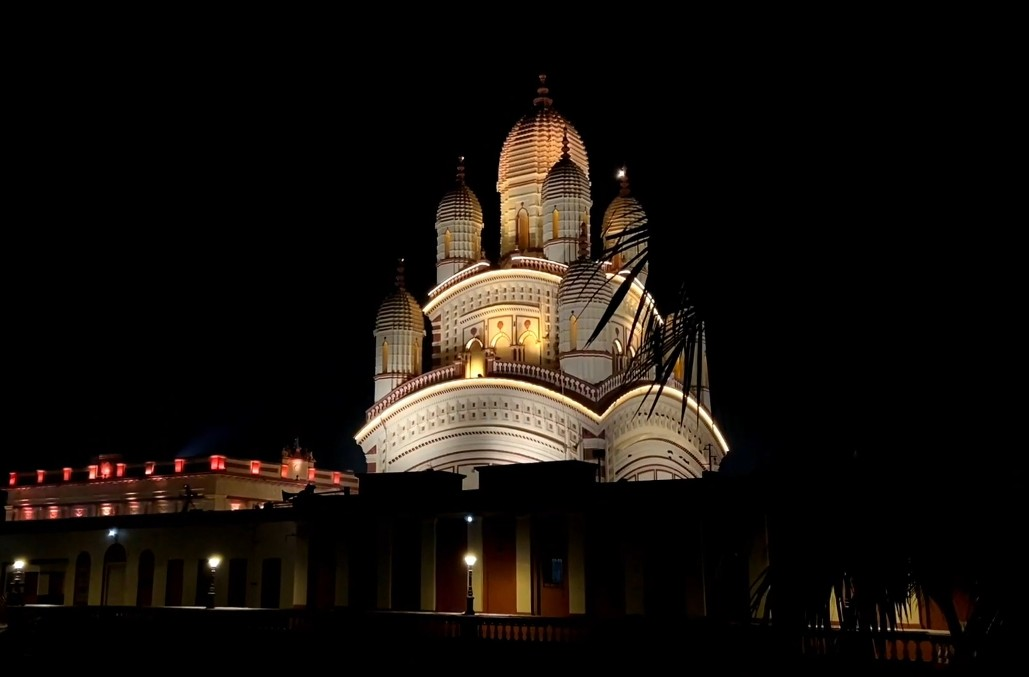
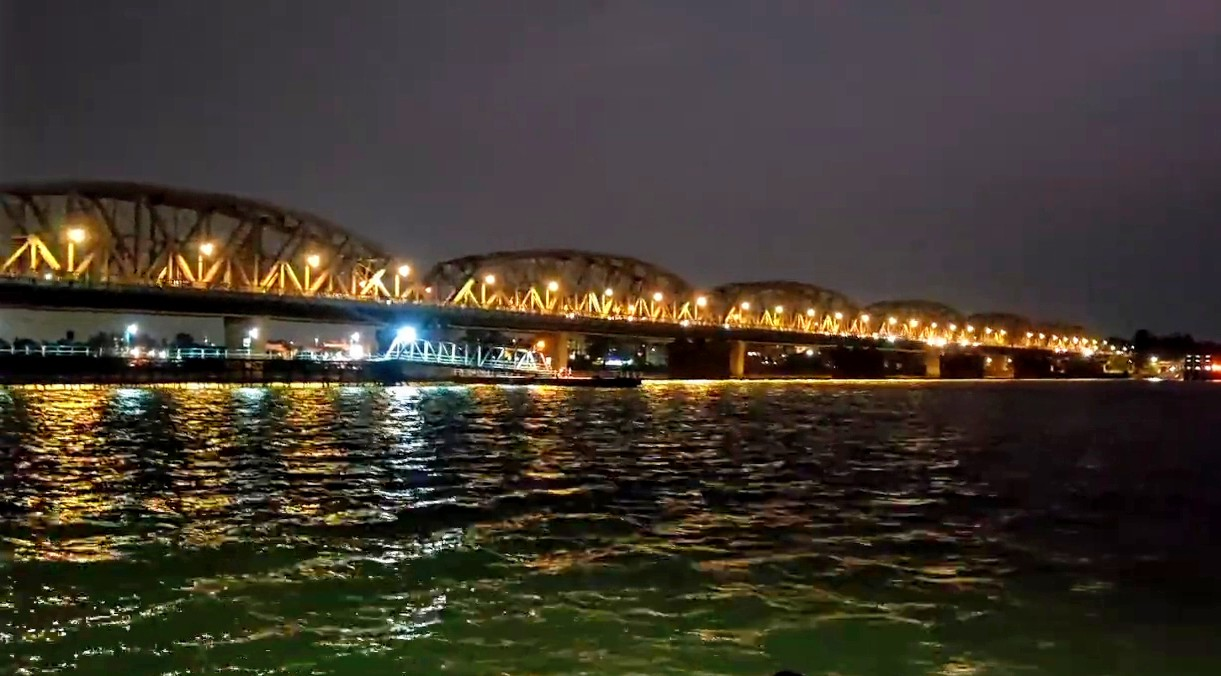
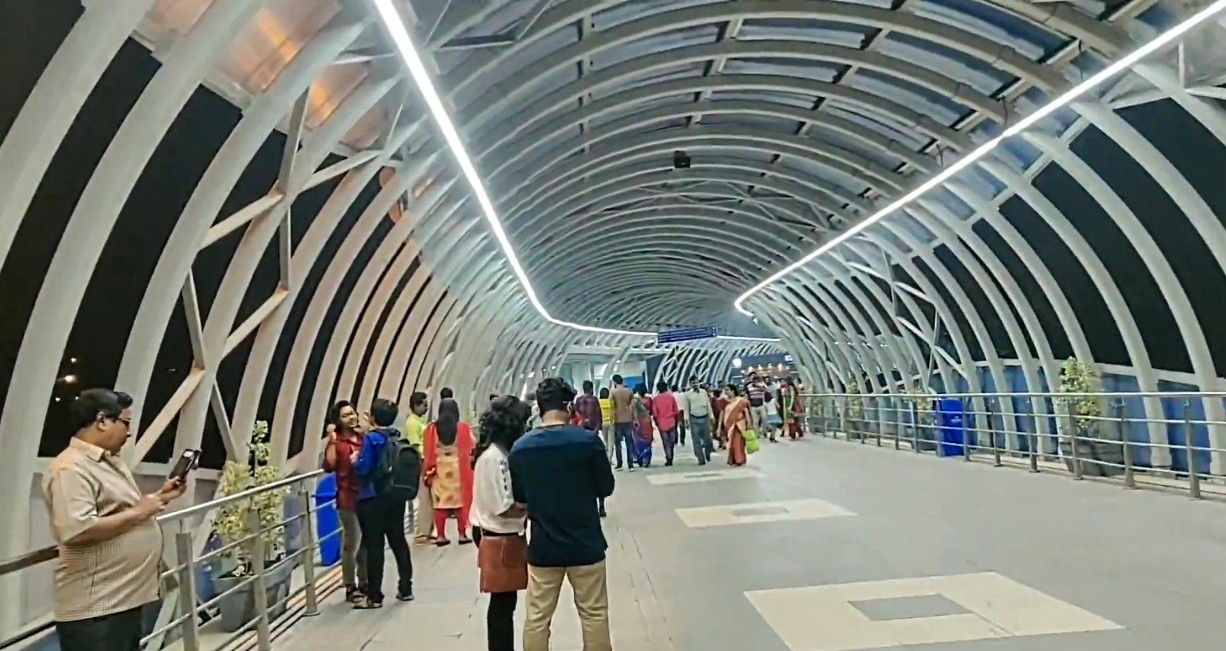
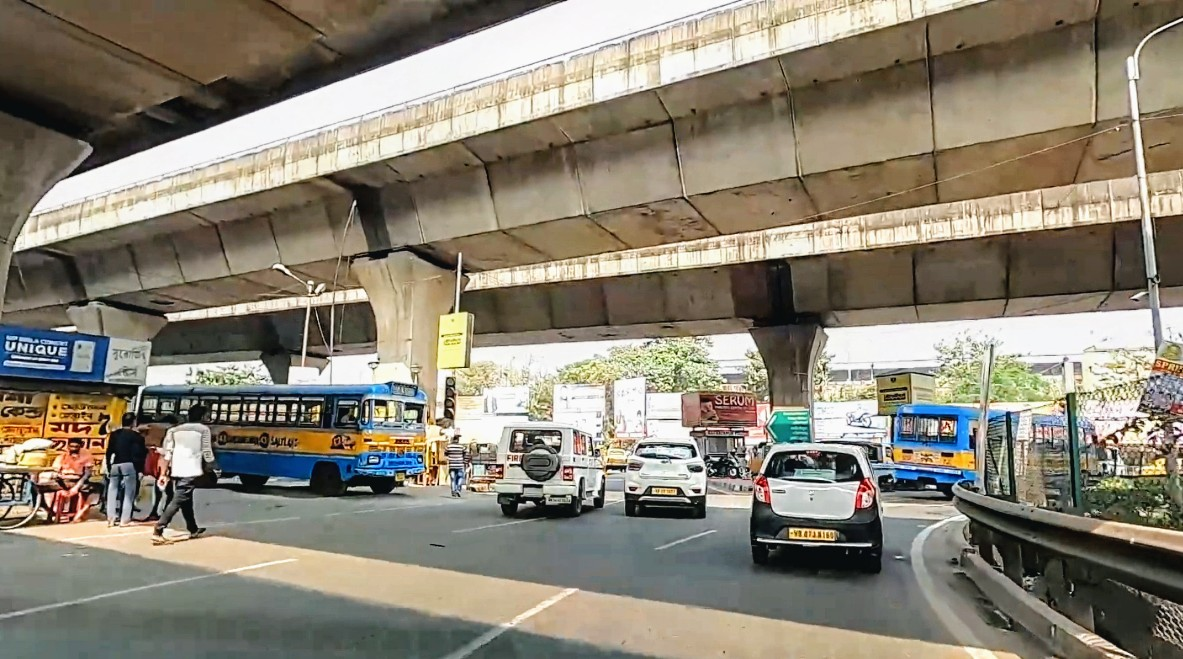
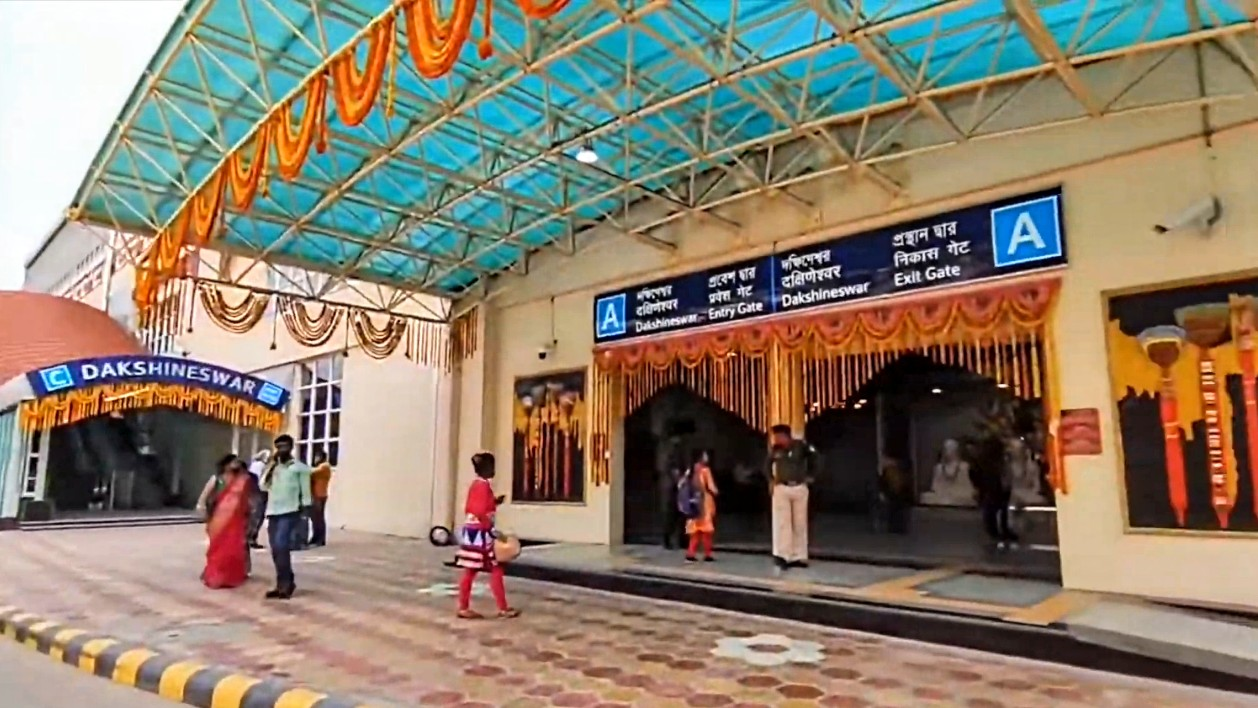
- From top, left to right: Dakshineswar Kali Temple; View of Bally Bridge from Dakshineswar; Dakshineswar Skywalk; Dakshineswar Bus Stand; Dakshineswar Metro Station

- Location in West Bengal, India Dakshineswar (West Bengal) Dakshineswar (India)
- Coordinates: 22.6554310°N 88.3578620°E
- Country: India
- State: West Bengal
- Division: Presidency
- District: North 24 Parganas
- Metro Station: Dakshineswar

Government
  - Type: Municipality
  - Body: Kamarhati Municipality

Languages
  - Official: Bengali, English
- Time zone: UTC+5:30 (IST)
- PIN: 700035, 700076
- Telephone code: +91 33
- Vehicle registration: WB
- Lok Sabha constituency: Dum Dum
- Vidhan Sabha constituency: Kamarhati
- Indian Railways station: Dakshineswar
- Kolkata Metro station: Dakshineswar

Dakshineswar is a neighbourhood in the Kolkata Metropolitan Area of North 24 Parganas district in the Indian state of West Bengal. It is a part of the area covered by Kolkata Metropolitan Development Authority (KMDA).

== Etymology ==
Dakshineswar gets its name from the Sanskrit name the Dakṣiṇeśvara of Shiva. The temple of Shiva is located around 1.5 km north of the famous Kali temple, at the southern part of Ariadaha. The temple is very important to the Shiva devotees and the Lingam is believed to be Svayambhu.

The mythological asura king, Banasura attributed to build the temple. There is also a tank named after the king, Ban Rajar Dighi. The locality was previously known as Deulpõtā, suggesting the ancient temple could have been destroyed and submerged, later discovered and brought to the riverside from the ancient lake and built the present temple by Dewan Haranath Ghosal, a local rich man in 19th century.

== Geography ==
=== Location ===
Dakshineswar is located at 22.655°N 88.358°E. Surrounded by Alambazar, Baranagar (separated by Belghoria Expressway) in South, Ariadaha in North, Dunlop in East and Ganges River (locally called Hooghly River) in West. Hooghly River is considered sacred to Hindus and its water is considered holy.

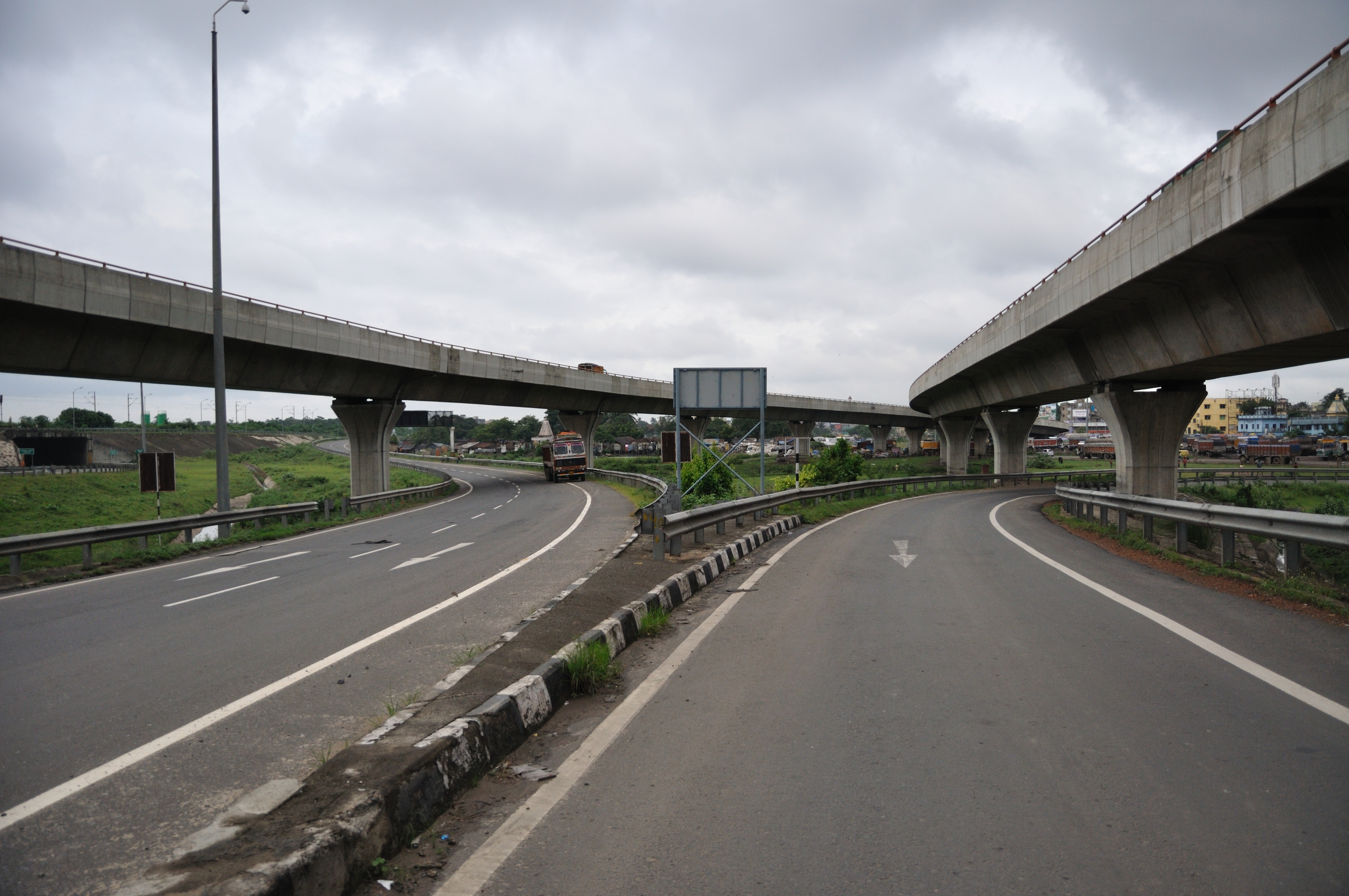
Belghoria Expressway, Dakshineshwar

=== Police station ===
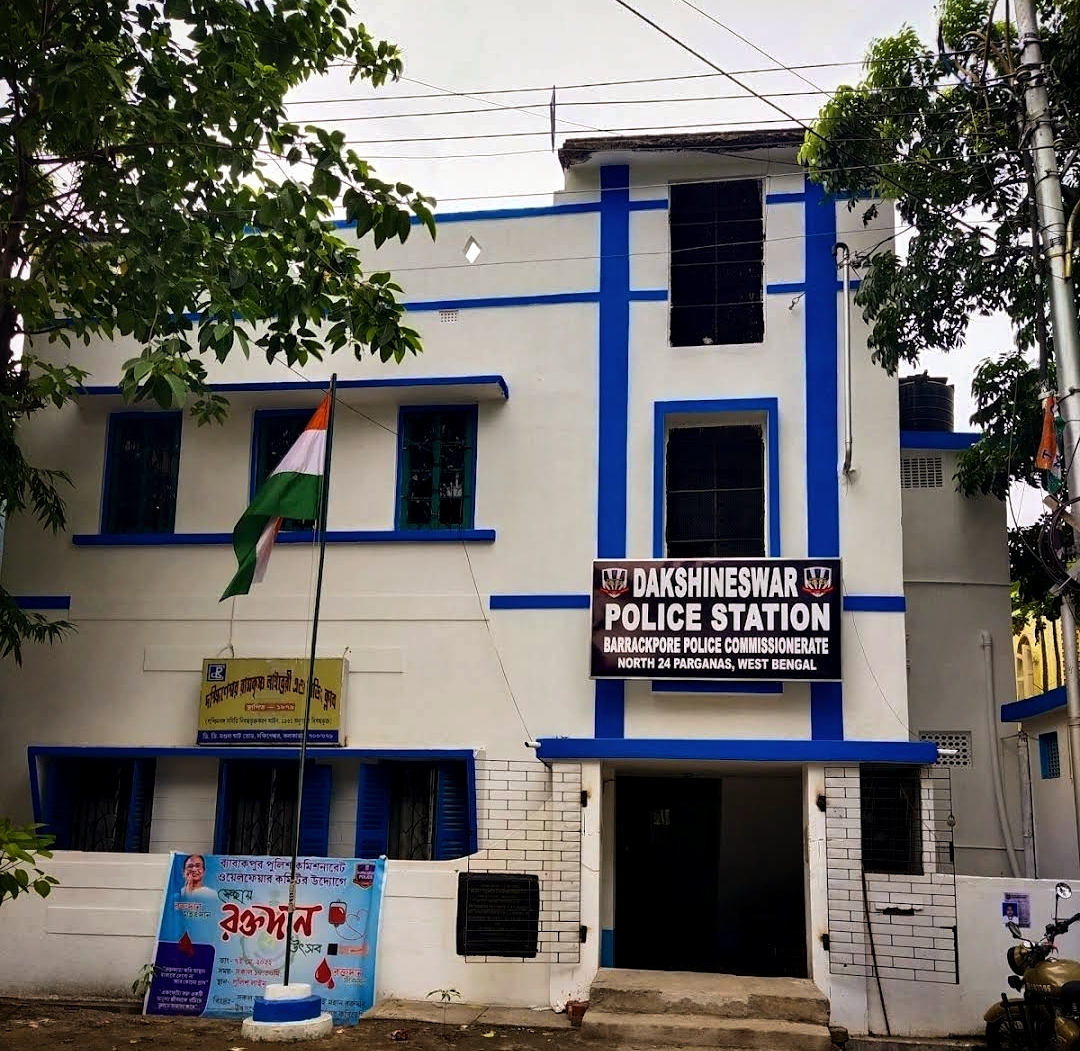
Dakshineswar police station

Dakshineswar has its own police station from 2022, before that the locality covered by Belgharia police station under Barrackpore Police Commissionerate has jurisdiction over Kamarhati Municipal area.

Also, Dakshineswar Kali Temple has a Police outpost in its boundary that serves the Kalibari estate.

== Pilgrimage centre ==
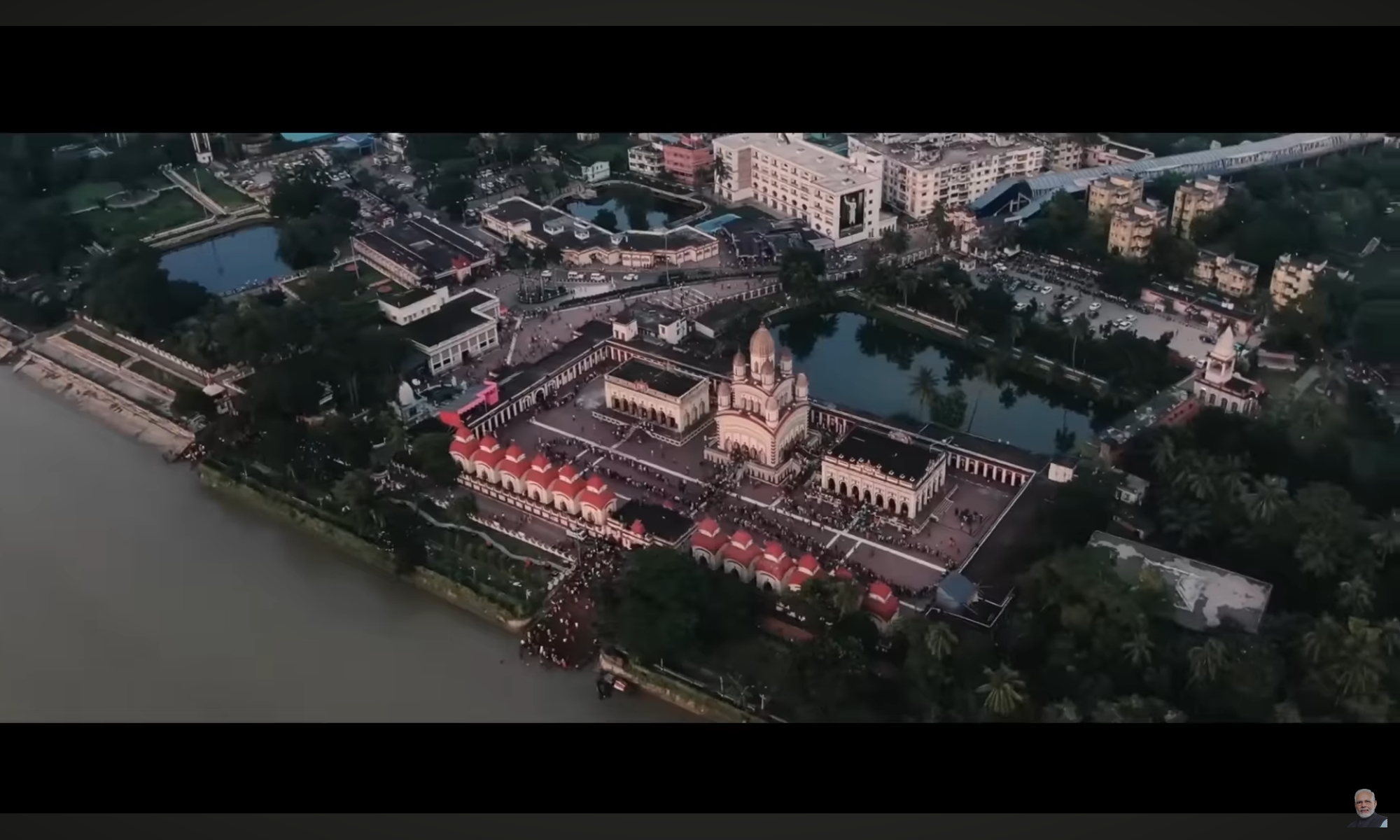
Dakshineswar Temple complex

Dakshineswar is the most important international pilgrimage centre in the district. Dakshineswar Kali Temple was built in 1855 by Rani Rashmoni. The temple is famous for its association with Shri Ramkrishna Paramahamsha Dev, a mystic of 19th Century Bengal. Large number of people gather at Dakshineswar throughout the year especially on the day of Shyama Puja, Shiva Chaturdashi, Bengali New Year's Day (naba barsha), Akshaya Tritiya and on 1 January every year on the occasion of Kalpataru Utsava (the day Shree Ramkrishna attained siddhi)

As per the District Statistical Handbook, "Panchabati Ban is the place where Shri Ramakrishna Paramhansha Dev planted five (pancha) trees i.e. Asvattha, Bata, Bel, Asok and Amlaki, under which he used to meditate. The Panchamundi Asan is called so because there are five human skulls buried underneath and Shri Ramakrishna Paramhansha Dev used to sit and meditate on the asan (seat) and attained siddhi (enlightenment/attainment with the Holy Spirit i.e. the God; in his case Goddess Kali)."

Adyapeath Ashram, located nearby at Dakshineswar, is the house of deities of Sri Adya Shakti.

== Military camp ==
Dakshineswar is also home to Indian Army, Indian Navy camps, Border Security Forces. There are various Military housing facilities for the armed forces with a primary school in the camp. The navy also uses the river for various water sports.

== Economy ==
=== Industry ===
WIMCO, a Swedish match company, which established in the 1920s a factory at Dakshineswar, was taken over by ITC Limited in 2011.

Emami Paper Mills Ltd. manufactures newsprint from waste paper. It is one of the largest producers of newsprint in the country. It has two plants – one at Dakshineswar and the other at Balgopalpur, Balasore.

=== Tourism ===
Dakshineswar is one of the most important religious shrines for Hindus and people from all over the world visit the Dakshineswar Kali Temple every day in numbers. Along with the Kali temple, there are other important Hindu temples like the Adyapeath temple, Ramakrishna Sarada Math and many more. Because of a large number of temples in the town and the Ganges River flowing by, it is also regarded as a twin town of Varanasi by the locals.

== Transport ==
Dakshineswar
T: temple, P: park, F: facility, C: college
Owing to space constraints in the small map, the actual locations in a larger map may vary slightly

Belghoria Expressway is a tolled expressway connecting the junction points of NH 19 and NH 16 at Rajchandrapur (near Dankuni) to Dakshineswar, across Nivedita Setu and then to NH 12 (Jessore Road), near Dumdum/Kolkata Airport. Dakshineswar is also connected by ordinary toll-free PWD Road to Dankuni across Vivekananda Setu (old Bally Bridge) and to Dunlop More on Barrackpore Trunk Road (part of both SH 1 and SH 2). Dakshineswar is also connected to Ariadaha via Ramkrishna Paramhansa Dev Road-Rabindranath Tagore Road-D.D. Mondal Ghat Road and to Baranagar via Surya Sen Road-Deshbandhu Road. Many buses ply along these roads.

Dakshineswar railway station is 13 km from Sealdah railway station on the Calcutta Chord line linking Dum Dum Junction railway station with Dankuni Junction railway station.

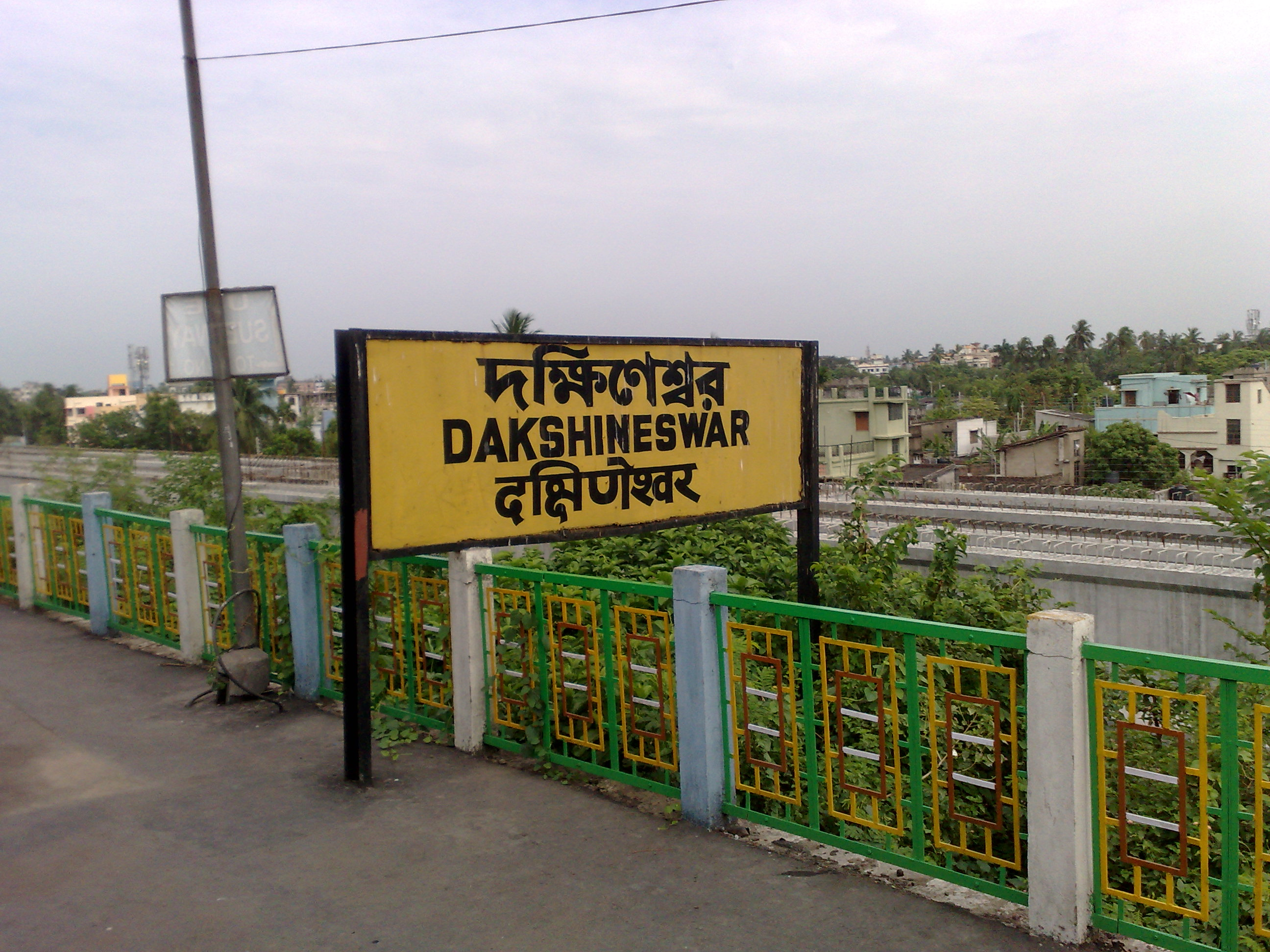
Dakshineswar railway station

Dakshineswar-Belur Math and Dakshineswar-Uttarpara ferry services are available across the Hooghly from Maa Bhabatarini Jetty.

=== Skywalk ===
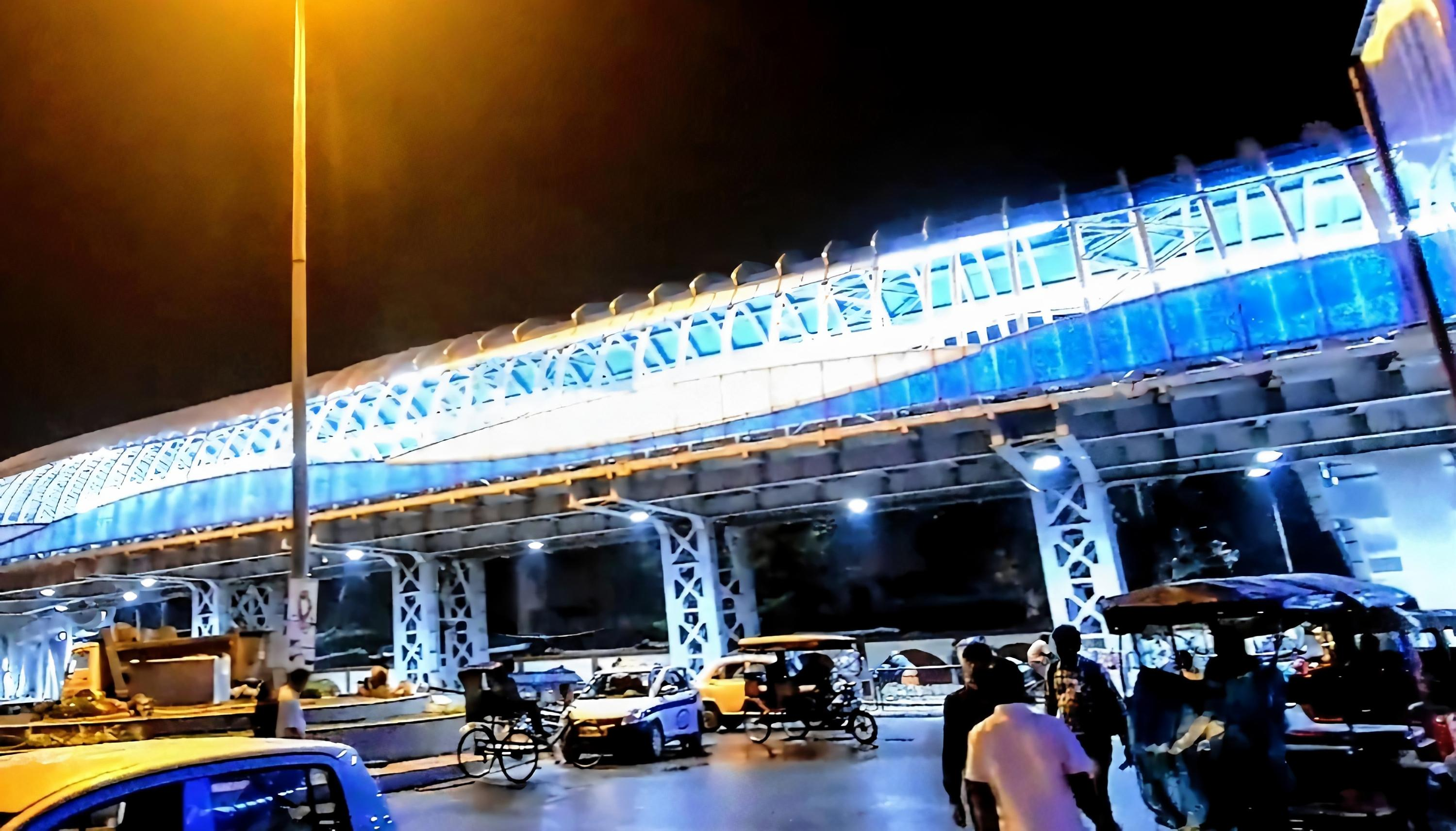
Dakshineswar Skywalk

The 350 m-long (1,150 ft) and narrow Rani Rashmoni Road links Dakshineswar bus stand and railway station to the Kali temple. This road is used annually by 13 million devotees. On festival days 1 lakh people visit Dakshineswar. On 17 March 2015, the Chief Minister Mamata Banerjee laid the foundation stone of a 400 m long, 10.5 m wide elevated walkway over the congested road to be built at a cost of Rs. 63 crore. The road below would be widened and used only by vehicles. The skywalk will have 12 escalators, 4 elevators and 8 staircases. There is provision for 200 shops inside the skywalk. The Skywalk, named Dakshineswar Rani Rashmoni Skywalk, was inaugurated by Banerjee, on 5 November 2018.

=== Metro ===
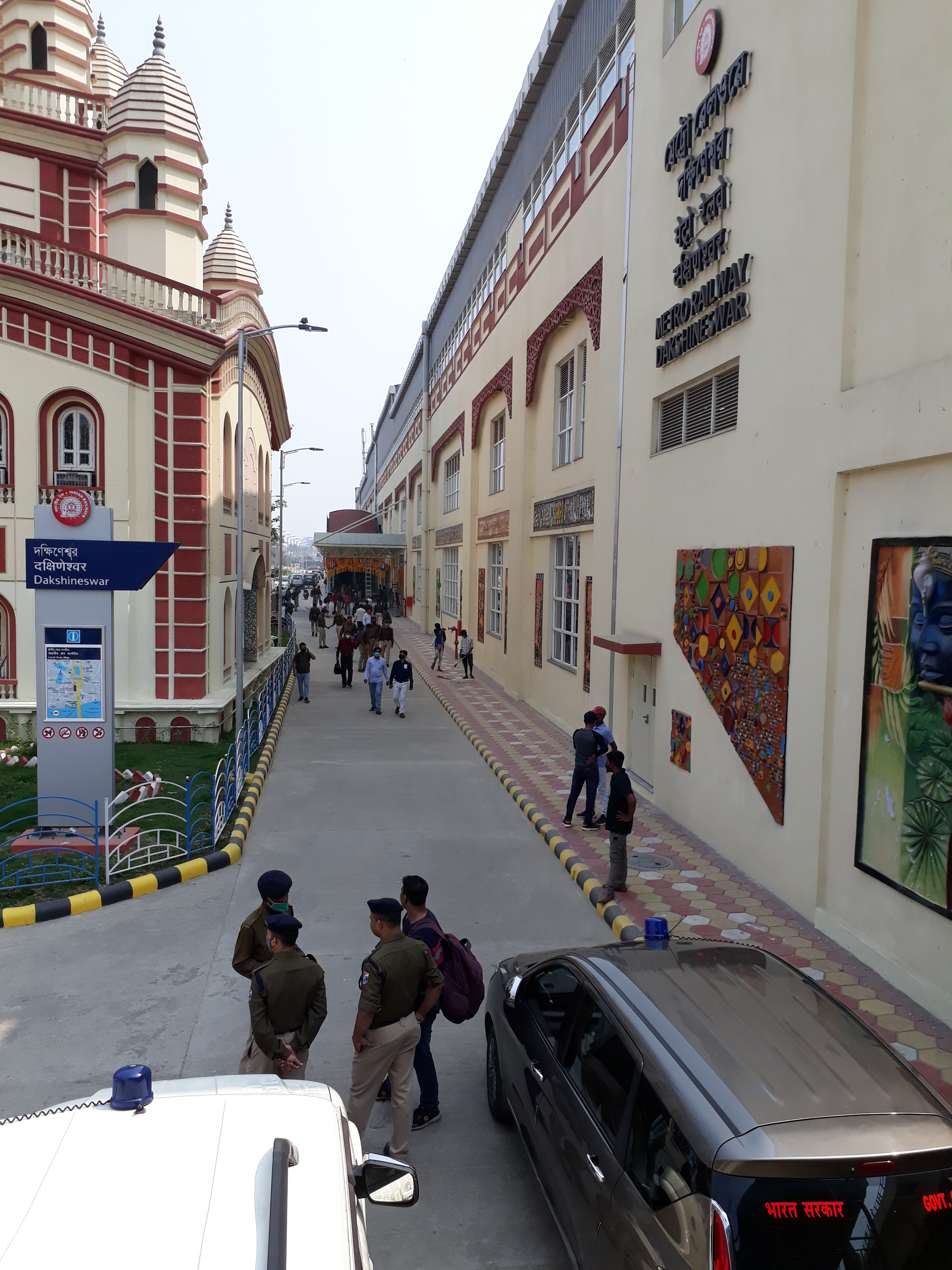
Dakshineswar Metro Station

The extension of Blue Line from Dum Dum to Dakshineswar was sanctioned in 2010–11. It was extended up to Noapara in 2013. The subsequent work was held up because of the encroachments on railway land. The extension was inaugurated on 22 February 2021 by Prime Minister Narendra Modi and now is a part of Kolkata Metro's North—South Line.

== Education ==
Hiralal Mazumdar Memorial College for Women was established at Dakshineswar in 1959. It offers honours courses in Bengali, English, Sanskrit, sociology, history, political science, philosophy, education, journalism, music, geography, economics, zoology, botany, food & nutrition, psychology, chemistry and general courses in BA and B Sc.

Adyapeath Annada Polytechnic College is a government-sponsored college and was established at Dakshineswar in 2016. It offers diploma engineering courses in mechanical, electrical and civil engineering.

Adyapeath Annada B.Ed. College was established at Dakshineswar in 2013.

Schools like Ariadaha Kalachand High School, Dakshineswar High School (oldest educational institution of the area), Dakshineswar Sri Sri Sarada Devi Balika Vidyalaya and Dakshineswar Bharati Bhaban Girls' School are there for Primary and secondary education.
