= Kamarhati Municipality =

Municipality in West Bengal, India

Type
- Type: Municipality

History
- Founded: 1899; 127 years ago
- Preceded by: Baranagar Municipality

Leadership
- Chairman: Vacant
- Vice Chairman: Tushar Chatterjee (AITC)

Structure
- Seats: 35
- Political groups: Government (35) AITC 35

Elections
- Last election: 2022
- Next election: 2027

Meeting place
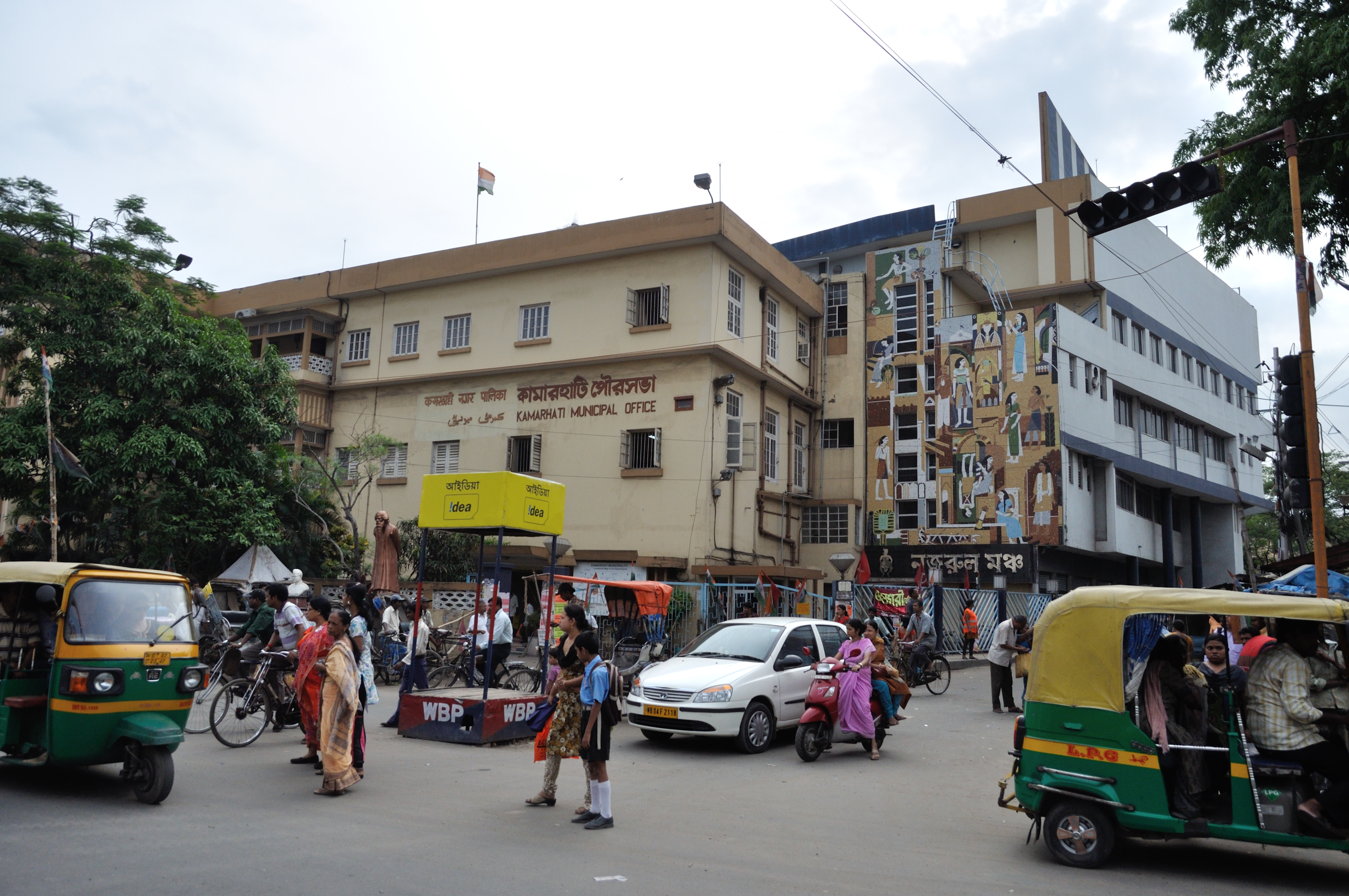
- Kamarhati Municipality Headquarters

Website
- kamarhatimunicipality.org

Kamarhati Municipality is the civic body that governs Kamarhati and its surrounding areas (Belgharia, Dakshineswar and Ariadaha) in the Barrackpore subdivision of North 24 Parganas district in West Bengal, India.
