= Belgharia High School =

School in Kolkata

Location
- 7 Umesh Mukherjee Road; Belgharia, West Bengal, 700056; India
- Coordinates: 22.6616°N 88.3853°E

Belgharia High School is one of the oldest schools in Belgharia suburb of Kolkata, founded in 1872.

A promising documentary on the school, titled "Belgharia Uccha Bidyalay: 150 Periye" (Belgharia High School: A Legacy of 150 Years), reflects its journey and historical growth throughout the period.
