= State Medical Faculty of West Bengal Entrance Examination =

Paramedical entrance examination in India

- Acronym: SMFWBEE
- Type: OMR sheet based (Pen & Paper)
- Administrator: State Medical Faculty of West Bengal
- Skills tested: Biology, Chemistry and Physics
- Purpose: Admission to various allied and healthcare courses in medical colleges, government institutions, and non-government affiliated institutions within West Bengal
- Duration: 3 hours
- Score range: 0 to 100
- Score validity: 1 year
- Offered: Conducted once per year
- Restrictions on attempts: No attempt limits
- Regions: West Bengal
- Languages: English language & Bengali language
- Fee: ₹500 for all candidates
- Website: https://smfwb.in/

The State Medical Faculty of West Bengal Entrance Examination or SMFWBEE is a state-level entrance exam conducted by the State Medical Faculty of West Bengal (SMFWB). This examination serves as the gateway for admission to various allied and healthcare courses in medical colleges, government institutions, and non-government affiliated institutions within West Bengal.

== Pattern of exam ==
The total marks in Physics, Chemistry and Biology paper would be 25 and 25, and 50, respectively, and the total full marks would be 100. Each Question would be of 1 mark. In every subject, all questions will be of Multiple Choice Questions (MCQ) type, with four options against each of the questions. Only one option is Correct, there is no negative marking.

== Syllabus ==
SMFWBEE syllabus consists of the core concepts of Physics, Chemistry and Biology taught in classes 11 and 12 as prescribed by the West Bengal Council of Higher Secondary Education.
