= State Medical Faculty of West Bengal =

Autonomous body constituted by the Government of West Bengal for paramedical education

- Abbreviation: SMFWB
- Type: Autonomous body
- Established: 1914; 112 years ago
- Parent institution: Ministry of Health & Family Welfare (West Bengal)
- President: Director of Medical Education for West Bengal
- Vice-president: Vacant
- Secretary in Charge: Debnath Ghosh
- Location: 14C, Beliaghata Main Road Kolkata : 700 085, Kolkata, West Bengal, India; 22°33′55″N 88°23′19″E
- Website: Official website
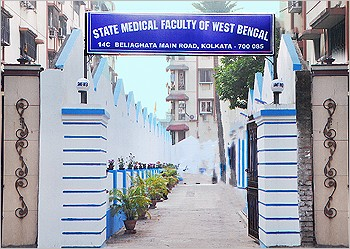

The State Medical Faculty of West Bengal (SMFWB) is an autonomous body constituted by the Government of West Bengal in India. It is empowered to conduct examinations for various Allied and Healthcare Courses as per the course curriculum approved by the State Government and to award Diplomas/Certificates to successful candidates. The faculty celebrated its centenary in 2015, marking 100 years of service.

== History ==
The State Medical Faculty of West Bengal (formerly known as The State Medical Faculty, Bengal) was established in 1914 by the then-Governor General of India, as detailed in a historical account published in "The Indian Medical Gazette" (Volume 49, Issue 10, pages 404-408, 1914). Its formation was a response to the need for an alternative medical education system after Calcutta University discontinued its Licentiate in Medicine and Surgery (LMS) course in 1913.

The faculty began with the objective of providing medical education to those who could not enroll in the MB degree course, offering examinations for Licentiate in Medical Faculty (LMF), Licentiate Examination in Dental Surgery (LDS), Membership Examination of the Medical Faculty (MMF). By the time of its establishment, various medical schools across Bengal, like Campbell Medical School, Calcutta Medical School, Calcutta National Medical Institute, Dacca Medical School, Lytton Medical School, Mymensingh, Ronaldshay Medical School, Burdwan ,Jackson Medical School, Jalpaiguri were affiliated with the faculty to conduct the courses.

After India gained independence, the Union Government decided to terminate admissions to the License in Medicine and Surgery (LMS) course, leading to significant changes in the medical education landscape. Consequently, in 1948, the Licentiate in Medical Faculty (LMF) course was abolished, followed by the discontinuation of the Membership Examination of the Medical Faculty (MMF) course. Additionally, the LDS course offered by the faculty was also phased out as Calcutta University began to offer BDS program. In the present day, the State Medical Faculty of West Bengal has adapted its role, focusing on the regulation and standardization of allied and healthcare science education. It now conducts admission examinations and counseling for entry into various authorized allied and healthcare courses across West Bengal. The faculty serves as the affiliation authority for both government and private allied and healthcare schools and colleges.

== Academics ==
The State Medical Faculty of West Bengal organises and conducts the SMFWBEE (State Medical Faculty of West Bengal Entrance Examination ) entrance exam for admission to allied and healthcare courses offered by affiliated colleges.

Diploma in Medical Laboratory Technology [Pathology, Microbiology & Biochemistry] : DMLT [ Tech] : 2 years + 6 months (Six Months) compulsory post examination training.
Diploma in Radiography [ Diagnostic ] : DRD [ Tech ] : 2 years + 6 months (Six Months) compulsory post examination training.
Diploma in Physiotherapy : DPT : 2 years + 6 months (Six Months) compulsory post examination training.
Diploma in Radiotherapeutic Technology : DRT [ Tech ] : 2 years + 6 months (Six Months) compulsory post examination training.
Diploma in Optometry with Ophthalmic Technique : D.OPT : 2 years + 6 months (Six Months) compulsory post examination training.
Diploma in Neuro Electro Physiology: DNEP: 2 years + 6 months (Six Months) compulsory post examination training.
Diploma in Perfusion Technology: DPFT : 2 years + 6 months (Six Months) compulsory post examination training.
Diploma in Cath-Lab Technician : DCLT : 2 years + 6 months (Six Months) compulsory post examination training.
Diploma in Dialysis Technique : Dialysis Technician : 2 years + 6 months (Six Months) compulsory post examination training.
Diploma in Critical Care Technology : DCCT : 2 years + 6 months (Six Months) compulsory post examination training.
Diploma in Operation Theatre Technology : DOTT : 2 years + 6 months (Six Months) compulsory post examination training.
Diploma in Diabetes Care Technology : DDCT : 2 years + 6 months (Six Months) compulsory post examination training.
Diploma in Electrocardiographic Technique : ECG Technician : 2 years + 6 months (Six Months) compulsory post examination training.
Diploma in Pharmacy : DPharm
