= Madan Mitra =

Indian politician (born 1954)

- Mitra in September 2019

Member of West Bengal Legislative Assembly for Kamarhati
- Incumbent
- Assumed office 2 May 2021
- Preceded by: Manash Mukherjee
- In office 13 May 2011 – 19 May 2016
- Preceded by: Manash Mukherjee
- Succeeded by: Manash Mukherjee

Cabinet Minister, Government of West Bengal
- In office 20 May 2011 – 18 November 2015
- Governor: M. K. Narayanan; D. Y. Patil (additional charge); Keshari Nath Tripathi
- Chief Minister: Mamata Banerjee
- Ministry and Departments: Sport and Youth Affairs; Transport
- Preceded by: Kanti Ganguly (from Sport and Youth Affairs); Ranjit Kundu (from Transport)
- Succeeded by: Aroop Biswas (from Sport and Youth Affairs); Mamata Banerjee (from Transport)

Chairman of the West Bengal Transport Corporation
- In office 2021–2026

Member of West Bengal Legislative Assembly for Bishnupur West
- In office 2009–2011
- Preceded by: Rathin Sarkar
- Succeeded by: Constituency merged to Bishnupur

Personal details
- Born: 3 December 1954 (age 71) Bhowanipore, Kolkata
- Party: Democratic Trinamool Congress (since 2026)
- Other political affiliations: Trinamool Congress (1998-2026) Indian National Congress
- Education: Calcutta University
- Occupation: Politician, Actor, Comedian

Madan Mitra (born 3 December 1954) is an Indian politician and social media influencer from West Bengal. Madan Mitra started his early political career with Indian National Congress (INC). He held many positions within the Indian Youth Congress, the INC's youth wing. In 1998, he joined Trinamool Congress, founded by his colleague Mamata Banerjee. In 2011, he was elected to the legislative assembly and became a state minister. He was arrested for the Sarada Chit Fund conspiracy case and got bail after 22 months. In 2023, Mitra debuted as an actor in the Bengali film Oh! Lovely.

== Early life ==
Mitra hails from an aristocratic family of Bhowanipore, Kolkata. In 1971, he passed out from South Suburban School. He received an under-graduate degree in history from Calcutta University in 1976.

== Political career ==
=== Early years ===
In 1973, Mitra entered politics and became the president of the students' union of Ashutosh College. He later became the south Kolkata president of the Indian Youth Congress. Initially, he belonged to the Priya Ranjan Dasmunsi faction. However, in 1976 he first switched to the Somen Mitra faction and then to the Mamata Banerjee faction. In 1990, he was appointed general secretary of the West Bengal unit of the Indian Youth Congress. He launched a taxi drivers' union the 1990s and also wrested control of the union of the SSKM Hospital.

Mamata Banerjee founded the Trinamool Congress in 1998. In 2000, he was appointed general secretary of the party. Four years later, he became the president of the Trinamool Youth Congress.

=== Electoral politics ===
In 2011 West Bengal Legislative Assembly election, Mitra was elected to the Legislative Assembly from the Kamarhati constituency. He became the sports minister and transport minister in the First Mamata Banerjee ministry. On 18 November 2015, he resigned from the cabinet after being named as an accused in the Saradha Group financial scandal.

Mitra lost the 2016 West Bengal Legislative Assembly election from his constituency. He was defeated by Manash Mukherjee of Communist Party of India (Marxist) by a margin of 4,198 votes. Following the defeat, he was relegated to the fringes of the party. On 26 April 2019, Mamata Banerjee announced that Mitra would contest the upcoming by-election for Bhatpara constituency which had become vacant due to the defection of Arjun Singh to the Bharatiya Janata Party, but he was defeated by Pawan Kumar Singh.

== Joining Rebel Bloc after 2026 ==
After 2026 West Bengal Legislative Assembly election He became MLA of Kamarhati . But TMC lost to gain majority but aftermath of election result it created 2026 All India Trinamool Congress split. Madan stayed with the old Trinomul Until July 15

== Personal life ==
Madan Mitra is married to Archana Mitra. They have two sons, Swarup Mitra and Subhorup Mitra. While Swarup is a businessman, Subhorup is a youth politician. Swarup's son Maharup was born in 2015. Mitra debuted his acting career with Haranath Chakraborty's film Oh! Lovely in August 2023.

== Filmography ==
Year	Film	Language	Notes	Ref.
2023	Oh! Lovely	Bengali	Debut movie	
2024	Sentimentaaal	Bengali		
2025	Lokkhikantopur Local	Bengali	played as Madan Mitra, himself	

== Controversies ==
In 2012, Mitra questioned the morals of Suzette Jordan, the Park Street rape victim for befriending strangers at 2 am.

On 13 December 2014, Mitra was arrested by the Central Bureau of Investigation for his alleged role in Saradha Group financial scandal. Mamata Banerjee claimed that the arrest was an example of political vendetta of the Bharatiya Janata Party. While in jail, he was admitted to a hospital in November 2015 after he complained of "uneasiness". In September 2016, he was granted bail and hasn't been admitted to the hospital since.

Mitra was interrogated by the Enforcement Directorate in September 2017 following the Narada sting operation.

On 17 May 2021, he along with senior minister in the Mamata Banerjee cabinet, Subrata Mukherjee, MLA and minister Firhad Hakim and former Mayor of Kolkata Sovan Chatterjee have been arrested by Central Bureau of Investigation from their house in connection with the Narada sting operation. He was granted bail on 28 May 2021.

On 12 June 2026, Enforcement Directorate (ED) raided Mitra’s seven properties. This is said to be part of a money laundering investigation as regards alleged municipality recruitment scam. ED has claimed that the investigation so far prove that Mitra received bribes in the form of cash and gold in municipality recruitment, where many undeserving candidates were selected by bypassing the rules. The ED has claimed to have recovered cash and documents from underneath Mitra’s bed, have also said to have found many undisclosed bank accounts.
