= Kamarhati Assembly constituency =

Kamarhati
- Constituency No. 112 for the West Bengal Legislative Assembly
- Interactive Map Outlining Kamarhati Assembly Constituency

Constituency details
- Country: India
- Region: East India
- State: West Bengal
- District: North 24 Parganas
- Lok Sabha constituency: Dum Dum
- Established: 1967
- Total electors: 1,62,648(SIR-2026)
- Reservation: None

Member of Legislative Assembly
- 18th West Bengal Legislative Assembly
- Incumbent Madan Mitra
- Party: DTC
- Elected year: 2026

Kamarhati Assembly constituency is a Legislative Assembly constituency of North 24 Parganas district in the Indian state of West Bengal.

== Overview ==
As per orders of the Delimitation Commission, No. 112 Kamarhati Assembly constituency is composed of the following: Ward Nos. 1 to 16 and 21 to 35 of Kamarhati Municipality.

Kamarhati Assembly constituency is part of No. 16 Dum Dum (Lok Sabha constituency).

== Members of the Legislative Assembly ==
Year	Name	Party
1967	Radhika Ranjan Banerjee	Communist Party of India (Marxist)
1969	Radhika Ranjan Banerjee	Communist Party of India (Marxist)
1971	Radhika Ranjan Banerjee	Communist Party of India (Marxist)
1972	Pradip Kumar Palit	Indian National Congress
1977	Radhika Ranjan Bannerjee	Communist Party of India (Marxist)
1982	Radhika Ranjan Bannerjee	Communist Party of India (Marxist)
1987	Radhika Ranjan Bannerjee	Communist Party of India (Marxist)
1991	Santi Ghatak	Communist Party of India (Marxist)
1996	Santi Ghatak	Communist Party of India (Marxist)
2001	Manash Mukherjee	Communist Party of India (Marxist)
2006	Manash Mukherjee	Communist Party of India (Marxist)
2011	Madan Mitra	Trinamool Congress
2016	Manash Mukherjee	Communist Party of India (Marxist)
2021	Madan Mitra	Trinamool Congress
2026	Madan Mitra	Trinamool Congress

== Election results ==
=== 2026 ===
2026 West Bengal Legislative Assembly election: Kamarhati
Party	Candidate	Votes	%	±%
AITC	Madan Mitra	64,817	43.71	▼7.46
BJP	Arup Choudhury	59,171	39.91	▲13.27
CPI(M)	Manash Mukherjee	20,203	13.63	▼5.99
INC	Kallol Mukherjee	1,345	0.91	
NOTA	None of the above	1,145	0.77	▼0.31
Majority		5,646	3.8	▼20.73
Turnout		148,272	91.06	▲17.84
AITC hold		Swing		

=== 2021 ===
2021 West Bengal Legislative Assembly election: Kamarhati
Party	Candidate	Votes	%	±%
AITC	Madan Mitra	73,845	51.17	
BJP	Anindya Banerjee	38,437	26.64	
CPI(M)	Sayandeep Mitra	28,310	19.62	
NOTA	None of the above	1,553	1.08	
Majority		35,408	24.53	
Turnout		144,310	73.22	
AITC gain from CPI(M)		Swing		

=== 2016 ===
In the 2016 election, Manas Mukherjee of CPI(M) defeated his nearest rival Madan Mitra of Trinamool Congress.

West Bengal assembly elections, 2016: Kamarhati constituency
Party	Candidate	Votes	%	±%
CPI(M)	Manash Mukherjee	62,194	45.09	+6.18
AITC	Madan Mitra	57,996	42.04	−15.92
BJP	Krishanu Mitra	10,797	+7.83	6.50
NOTA	None of the above	2,623	1.90	+1.90
Independent	Manas Mukherjee	1,009	0.73	
Independent	Subhojit Dutta	923	0.67	
BSP	Rekha Devi	848	0.61	
CPI(ML)L	Archana Ghatak	399	0.29	
PDS	Santanu Chatterjee	352	0.26	
Turnout		1,37,943	74.85	−4.59
CPI(M) gain from AITC		Swing		

=== 2011 ===
In the 2011 election, Madan Mitra of Trinamool Congress defeated his nearest rival Manas Mukherjee of CPI(M).

West Bengal assembly elections, 2011: Kamarhati constituency
Party	Candidate	Votes	%	±%
AITC	Madan Mitra	74,112	57.96	+17.25#
CPI(M)	Manash Mukherjee	49,758	38.91	−17.49
BJP	Shikha Sarkar	1,699	1.33	
Independent	Sushanta Dey	1,079		
CPI(ML)L	Nabendu Dasgupta	739		
PDS	Tarak Bhadra	479		
Turnout		127,866	79.44	
AITC gain from CPI(M)		Swing	34.74#	

=== 2006 ===
In the 2006 and 2001 state assembly elections Manash Mukherjee of CPI(M), won from the Kamarhati assembly seat defeating his nearest rivals Subhrangshu Bhattacharya of Trinamool Congress in 2006 and Chittaranjan Bag of Trinamool Congress in 2001. Contests in most years were multi cornered but only winners and runners are being mentioned. Santi Ghatak of CPI(M) had won it in 1996 and in 1991 defeating his nearest rivals Sambhunath Dutta of Congress in 1996 and Salil Biswas of Congress in 1991. Radhika Ranjan Bannerjee of CPI(M) had won this seat in 1987, 1982, and in 1977defeating Ajoy Ghosal of Congress in 1987, Purnendu Bimal Dutta of Congress in 1982 and Jayanta Chandra Sen of Congress in 1977.

=== 1972 ===
Pradip Kumar Palit of Congress won in 1972. Radhika Ranjan Banerjee of CPI(M) won in 1971, 1969 and in 1967. Prior to that the Kamarhati seat did not exist.
