= Pratap Chandra Memorial Homoeopathic Hospital & College =

- Type: Medical College and Hospital
- Established: 1926; 100 years ago
- Academic affiliations: WBUHS; NCH
- Chairman: Bidhu Bhushan Jana
- Principal: Prof. Dr. Santanu Ghosh
- Location: Kolkata, West Bengal, India; 22.5803434°N 88.3824128°E
- Campus: Urban
- Website: pcmhhc.org.in
- Location in Kolkata Pratap Chandra Memorial Homoeopathic Hospital & College (India)

Pratap Chandra Memorial Homoeopathic Hospital & College (PCMHHC) is the homoeopathic medical college and hospital in Kolkata, West Bengal. The college was established in 1926 by Jitendra Nath Majumder, in order to commemorate the name of his father, Pratap Chandra Majumder, who was one of the pioneers of homoeopathy in India and popularised homoeopathy in West Bengal. The school is the second oldest homeopathic institution in India as well as Asia.

== Affiliation ==
The college is affiliated to the West Bengal University of Health Sciences and is recognized by the Central Council of Homoeopathy (CCH) and AYUSH under the Ministry of Health and Family Welfare, Govt. of India and is recognized by the Govt. of West Bengal.

== Equipment ==
The college is equipped with laboratories, library, anatomy dissection hall and 24-hour emergency services. Special facilities like x-ray, ECG, ultrasonography, eye, dental, ENT, and physiotherapy units are provided. The college department is now equipped with computer in order to import education to Repertory.

== Professional BHMS (Bachelor of Homoeopathic Medicine and Surgery) degree colleges ==
The other 12 BHMS colleges are:

- Bengal Homoeopathic Medical College and Hospital, Asansol
- Birbhum Vivekananda Homoeopathic Medical College & Hospital
- Burdwan Homoeopathic Medical College & Hospital
- D.N. De Homoeopathic Medical College & Hospital, Kolkata
- Kharagpur Homoeopathic Medical College and Hospital
- Mahesh Bhattacharya Homoeopathic Medical College and Hospital, Howrah
- Metropolitan Homoeopathic Medical College & Hospital, Kolkata
- Midnapore Homoeopathic Medical College and Hospital
- National Institute of Homoeopathy, Kolkata
- Netai Charan Chakravarty Homoeopathic Medical College & Hospital, Howrah
- Purulia Homoeopathic Medical College & Hospital
- The Calcutta Homoeopathic Medical College & Hospital, Kolkata

== See also ==
- Calcutta Homoeopathic Medical College & Hospital
- Calcutta Unani Medical College and Hospital
- List of hospitals in India
- Healthcare in India
- Mahesh Bhattacharya Homoeopathic Medical College and Hospital
