= CTS =

Cts or CTS may refer to:

== Arts and entertainment ==
=== Television ===
- Chinese Television System, a Taiwanese broadcast television station, including:
  - CTS Main Channel (華視主頻)
  - CTS Education and Culture (華視教育文化頻道)
  - CTS Recreation (華視休閒頻道)
  - CTS News and Info (華視新聞頻道) (on Chunghwa Telecom MOD only)
- Christian Television System, in South Korea
- Crossroads Television System, in Canada
- The Catherine Tate Show, a British television program
- Channel 44 (Adelaide), in Australia, which uses the call-sign CTS33
- Country Television Services, Australia

== Businesses ==
- China Travel Service, the tourism and travel agency of China, parent company renamed China Tourism Group in 2020.
- Cognizant Technology Solutions, a US-based information technology services company
- Christmas Tree Shops, a now defunct store brand.
- Compagnie des Transports Strasbourgeois, a public transport company based in Strasbourg, France
- Connexxion Taxi Services, a division of Connexxion, a large public transport company in the Netherlands
- Colorado Time Systems, a US-based company providing aquatic timing services

== Educational institutions ==
=== Seminaries ===
- Chicago Theological Seminary, affiliated with the United Church of Christ, in Chicago, Illinois
- Christian Theological Seminary, affiliated with the Disciples of Christ, in Indianapolis, Indiana
- Concordia Theological Seminary, affiliated with the Missouri Synod of the Lutheran Church, in Fort Wayne, Indiana
- Columbia Theological Seminary, affiliated with the Presbyterian Church, in Decatur, Georgia

=== Other educational institutions ===
- College of Technological Sciences–Cebu, Cebu City, Philippines
- The Calcutta Technical School, West Bengal, India

== Science and technology ==
=== Computing and telecommunications ===
- Ciphertext stealing in cryptography
- Clear to send (disambiguation) control signal
- Common Type System, a common set of types in the .NET Framework
- Hermes Communications Technology Satellite, a Canadian communications satellite launched in 1976
- Computational transportation science, an interdisciplinary field addressing the modeling, planning, and economics of transportation

=== Medicine ===
- Carpal tunnel syndrome, a medical condition causing pain in parts of the hand
- Cracked tooth syndrome, a medical condition in which a posterior tooth has developed a crack
- Cubital tunnel syndrome, compression of the ulnar nerve at the elbow
- Cathepsin, a class of enzymes
- Cardiothoracic surgery, a field of medicine involved in surgical treatment of diseases affecting organs inside the thorax (chest)

=== Other uses in science and technology ===
- CTS (rocket stage), a Chinese solid-fuel upper stage
- Cadillac CTS, a luxury automobile made by Cadillac, succeeded by CT5 model
- Combat Training Squadron, look at List of United States Air Force training squadrons
- Conflict Tactics Scale, a social survey instrument for the study of conflict in relationships
- Copper Tube Size
- Cattle Tracing System, administered by the British Cattle Movement Service
- Pandan Bikol language, ISO 639-3 code

== Other uses ==
- Cambridge Tolkien Society
- Catholic Truth Society, an organisation that produces Catholic literature
- Certificate in Theological Studies (CTS) at Divine Word Seminary
- Combat Zones That See, a US defense project
- Consider the Source, New York City based jam band
- Counter Terrorism Service, an Iraqi security and intelligence agency tasked with counterterrorism
- Cosmic Top Secret, the highest of four levels of NATO classified information
- Crack the Skye, an album by heavy metal band Mastodon
- New Chitose Airport (IATA code)
- The NASCAR Craftsman Truck Series
