= Calcutta (disambiguation) =

Calcutta is the former anglicised name of the city of Kolkata in the state of West Bengal in India.

Calcutta may also refer to:

== Places ==
- Kolkata district, an administrative district in West Bengal, India
- Calcutta, Indiana, U.S.
- Calcutta, Ohio, United States
- Calcutta, West Virginia, United States
- Calcutta, Suriname
- Calcutta, Belize
- Black Hole of Calcutta, an 18th-century dungeon in Fort William, Calcutta

== Film ==
- Calcutta (1947 film), a film noir starring Alan Ladd
- Calcutta (1969 film), a documentary film by Louis Malle
- Calcutta 71 (1971 film), a film by Mrinal Sen
- Calcutta trilogy (disambiguation)
- Calcutta, a Tamil film dubbed from Telugu film Choodalani Vundi

== Schools ==
- University of Calcutta
- Calcutta Boys' School
- Calcutta Girls' High School
- Calcutta Institute of Engineering and Management
- Calcutta International School
- Calcutta National Medical College
- Calcutta Public School
- Calcutta School of Music
- Calcutta Technical School

== Music ==
- Calcutta (band), American alternative rock band
- "Calcutta" (song), 1961 instrumental by Lawrence Welk
- "Calcutta (Taxi Taxi Taxi)", 1998 song by Dr. Bombay (Jonny Jakobsen)
- Calcutta (singer), Italian singer-songwriter, born Edoardo D'Erme

== Military topics ==
- HMS Calcutta, five ships of the Royal Navy
- Siege of Calcutta, battle between the armies Britain and the Nawab of Bengal in the 18th century

== Other uses ==
- Calcutta Club
- Calcutta auction, a method of allocating gambling bets by auction
- The Calcutta Cup, an annual rugby match between England and Scotland
- Short S.8 Calcutta, flying boat

== See also ==
- Oh! Calcutta!, a theatrical revue
- Kolkata (disambiguation)
