= Nehru Homeopathic Medical College & Hospital =

Homeopathic medical college located in New Delhi

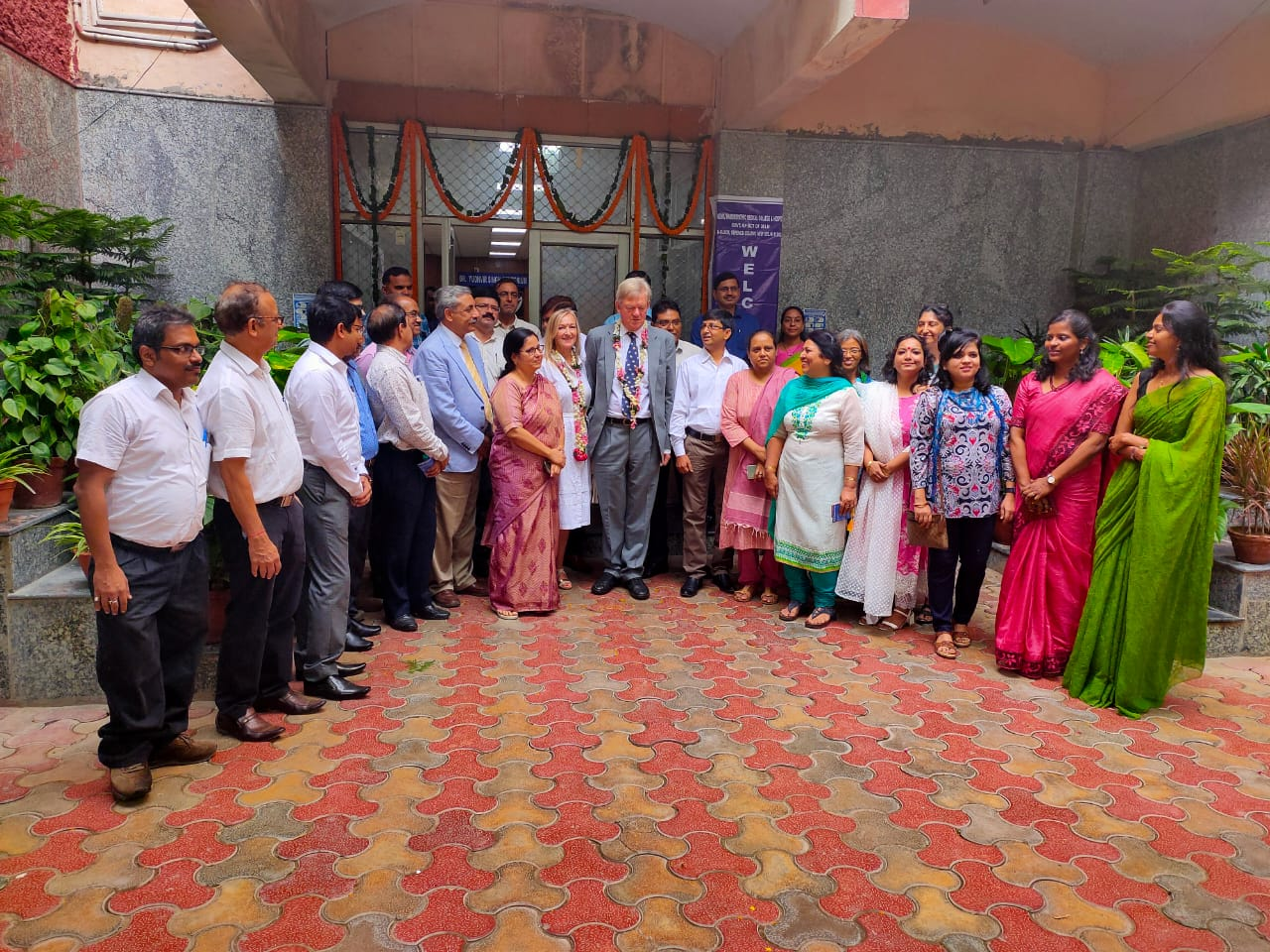
- British MP Tredinnick in a group photo with all faculty members of NHMC & H
- Motto in English: Quality education and propagation of Homeopathy
- Type: Public
- Established: 1967
- Affiliations: University of Delhi
- Principal: Dr. Seema Rai
- Location: Defence Colony, New Delhi, India, New Delhi; 28.5712215°N 77.2284314°E
- Campus: Urban
- Nickname: NHMC
- Website: nhmc.delhi.gov.in

Nehru Homeopathic Medical College & Hospital (NHMCH) is a homeopathic medical college located in New Delhi. The college offers two courses in the field of homeopathic education: a Bachelor of Homeopathic Medicine and Surgery (B.H.M.S) and MD (Hom). NHMC has been affiliated with the University of Delhi since 1992 and functions under the Government of Delhi. It is regarded as one of the topmost and premier Homeopathic Medical Colleges for B.H.M.S in India.

== History ==
NHMC and Hospital attached to it was founded by Padma Bhushan winner Yudhvir Singh. The foundation stone of the college building was laid by Sushila Nayyar, Minister of Health and Family Welfare, India, on 22 August 1963. The OPD Wing was inaugurated by Lal Bahadur Shastri on 6 May 1964. Classes in the college were commenced from 1967 for the DHMS Course, upgraded to the BHMS course under the Board of Homoeopathic System of Medicine. On 1 September 1972, this institution was handed over by the Yudhvir Singh Charitable Trust to the University of Delhi Administration.

After the procurement of the Nehru Homoeopathic Medical College and Hospital by the Government of Delhi, Jugal Kishore was made its first director.

== Controversies ==
=== COVID-19 Hospital objection ===
On 16 April 2020, NHMC & Hospital was declared to be dedicated to the COVID-19 patients by the Delhi government. After this decision, many of the Defence Colony residents living near the hospital premises had raised their concerns about hospital management and safety issues in handling COVID-19 patients. Major (Retired) Ranjit Singh, the President of the Defence Colony RWA, had also written a letter to Delhi Chief Minister Arvind Kejriwal about the risks associated with shifting COVID-19 patients to Nehru hospital and also raised questions on the reliability of homeopathic hospitals. However, Anu Kapoor, Medical Superintendent of Nehru Hospital, told Mail Today that they were only in preparation mode for converting the hospital into a dedicated COVID-19 hospital at that time.

== See also ==
- Central Council of Homeopathy
- National Institute of Homoeopathy
