= Netai Charan Chakravarty Homoeopathic Medical College & Hospital =

- Type: Medical College and Hospital
- Established: 1983; 43 years ago
- Affiliations: WBUHS
- Principal: Prof. (Dr.) Debanjan Sasmal
- Location: 45, F Rd, Belgachia, Liluah, Howrah, West Bengal, 711101, India; 22.6073751°N 88.324762°E
- Website: www.ncchmchospital.in
- Location within Kolkata Location within India

Netai Charan Chakravarty Homoeopathic Medical College & Hospital is a homoeopathic medical college in Howrah, West Bengal, India. It offers the Bachelor of Homeopathic Medicine and Surgery (BHMS) degree course. The college is recognized by the Central Council of Homoeopathy (CCH), Ministry of Ayush and affiliated with the West Bengal University of Health Sciences. This college was established in 1983.

== See also ==
- Calcutta Homoeopathic Medical College & Hospital
- Calcutta Unani Medical College and Hospital
- List of hospitals in India
- Healthcare in India
- Mahesh Bhattacharya Homoeopathic Medical College and Hospital
