= Birendra Nath Mallick =

Indian neurobiologist (born 1956)

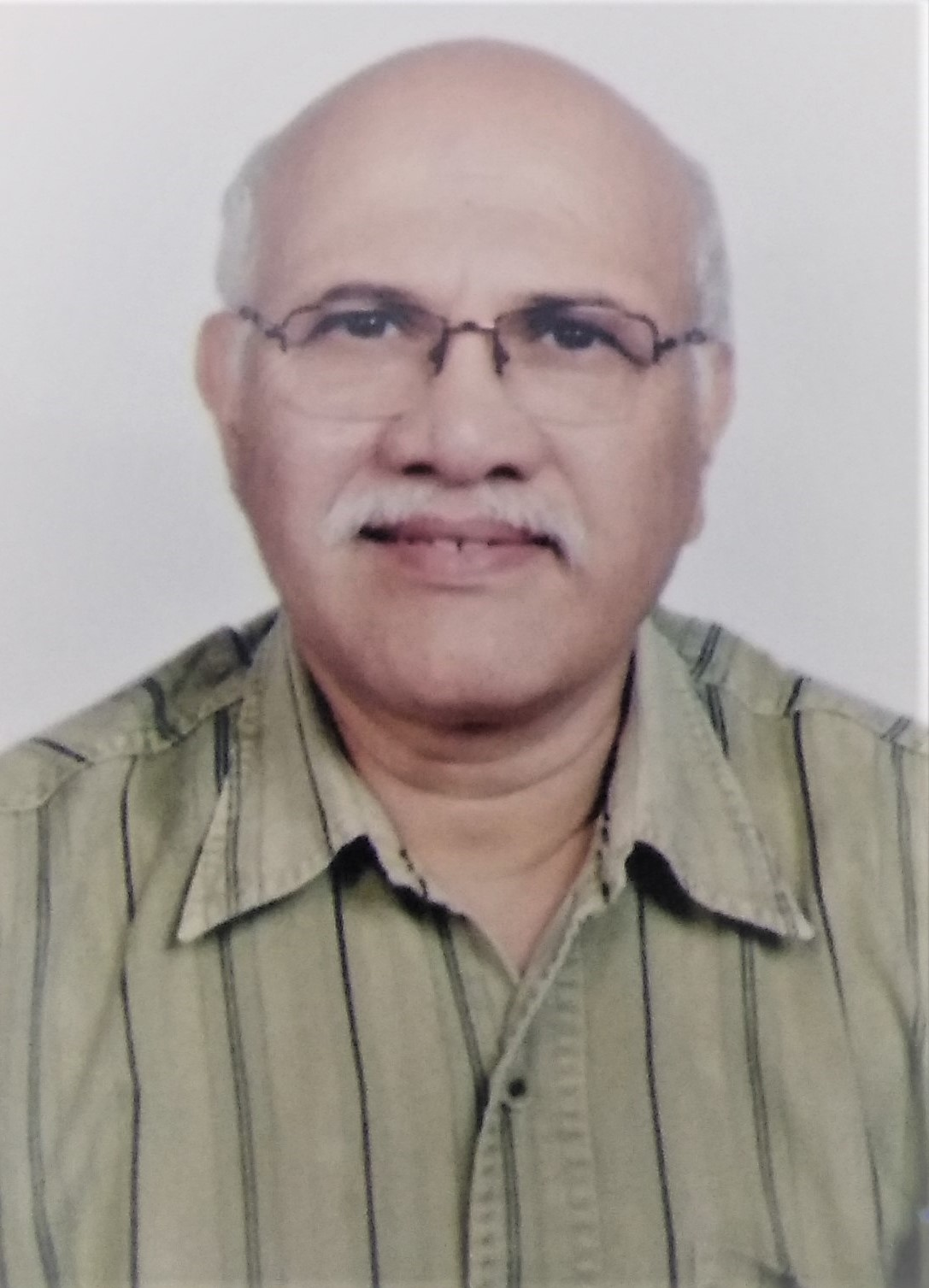
- Born: 1 August 1956 (age 70); Jamalpur, Bihar, India
- Education: University of Calcutta; Calcutta Homoeopathic Medical College; AIIMS Delhi
- Known for: Neurophysiological studies on Sleep and wakefulness
- Awards: 1984 B. K. Anand Prize; 1992 ICMR Shakuntala Amir Chand Award; 1999 National Bioscience Award; 2001 Shanti Swarup Bhatnagar Prize
- Scientific career
- Fields: Neurobiology
- Workplaces: Amity University, Noida; Jawaharlal Nehru University; University of California, Los Angeles; University of Nice Sophia Antipolis

Birendra Nath Mallick (born 1 August 1956) is an Indian neurobiologist and a professor of neurobiology at the School of Life Sciences of Jawaharlal Nehru University. Known for his research on the Neuroscience of sleep, Mallick has authored and edited articles and in the first monograph on REM Sleep. He is a J. C. Bose National Fellow of the Department of Biotechnology and an elected fellow of all the three major Indian science academies viz. National Academy of Sciences, India, Indian Academy of Sciences, and Indian National Science Academy.

The Council of Scientific and Industrial Research, the apex agency of the Government of India for scientific research, awarded him the Shanti Swarup Bhatnagar Prize for Science and Technology, one of the highest Indian science awards for his contributions to Medical Sciences in 2001.

== Biography ==
B. N. Mallick, born on 1 August 1956 at Jamalpur, a small village in the Indian state of Bihar to Manju Mukherjee and Baidya Nath Mallick. He received his BSc hons at the University of Calcutta in 1978 winning B. K. S. Medal for standing first in City College, Kolkata and earned a master's degree in physiology in 1981 with a University Gold Medal for securing the first rank in the university. While pursuing his master's studies, he simultaneously did a medical course at Calcutta Homoeopathic Medical College and obtained a degree in homeopathic medicine (DMS) from the Central Council of Homoeopathy.

== Career ==
Rapid eye movement of a dog

Mallick carried his doctoral research on sleep and wakefulness on to his later career and worked on the neural mechanisms involved with sleep. His studies combined the electrophysiological and biochemical aspects of rapid eye movement sleep (REM sleep) and he established that the increased production of noradrenaline activated neuronal Na+/K+-ATPase, triggering REM sleep-loss and resultant brain excitability. According to him, REM sleep maintains brain excitability and suggested that this unique phase of sleep could be regulated by ceasing REM-off neurons present in the locus coeruleus; his research has been documented by way of texts and articles Besides, he has published four books viz. Rapid Eye Movement Sleep, Sleep-Wakefulness, Environment and Physiology and Rapid Eye Movement Sleep: Regulation and Function; the first listed, which is a monograph co-edited with Shojiro Inoue, is reported to be the first book published on REM sleep. He has also contributed chapters to books published by others and his work has been cited in a number of publications. He is a member of the Neurobiology Task force of the Department of Biotechnology.

== Awards and honors ==
Mallick received B. K. Anand Prize of the Association of Physiologists and Pharmacologists of India in 1984 for the best research paper in physiology and the Shakuntala Amir Chand Award of the Indian Council of Medical Research in 1992. He was one of the first recipients of the National Bioscience Award for Career Development of the Department of Biotechnology in 1999. The National Academy of Sciences, India elected him as a fellow in 2000 and he received the Chandra Kanta Dandiya Prize of P. C. Dandiya Trust in 2001. The Council of Scientific and Industrial Research awarded him Shanti Swarup Bhatnagar Prize, one of the highest Indian science awards the same year and he became an elected member of Guha Research Conference in 2004. The Indian National Science Academy elected him as a fellow in 2005 and he became a fellow of the Indian Academy of Sciences in 2010, the same year as he was awarded the J. C. Bose National Fellowship by the Science and Engineering Research Board of the Department of Science and Technology. The award orations delivered by him include the Ramendra Sundar Sinha Memorial Oration Award (2001) as well as Platinum Jubilee Lecture (2009) of Physiological Society of India and J. N. Mukherjee Memorial Lecture of City College, Kolkata (2007).

== Selected bibliography ==
=== Chapters ===
- Jaime M. Monti; Seithikurippu Ratnas Pandi-Perumal; Hanns Möhler, Dinesh Pal (Chapter author), B. N. Mallick (Chapter author) (28 September 2010). "GABA-ergic Modulation of Pontine Cholinergic and Noradrenergic Neurons for EM Sleep Generation". GABA and Sleep: Molecular, Functional and Clinical Aspects. Springer Science & Business Media. pp. 199–. ISBN 978-3-0346-0226-6.
- Takeshi Sakurai; S.R. Pandi-Perumal; Jaime M. Monti, B. N. Mallick (chapter author), M. A. Khanday (chapter author), Abhishek Singh (chapter author) (22 September 2015). "Orexin Induced Modulation of REM Sleep and its Loss Associated Patho-physiological Changes are Mediated through Locu Coeruleus". Orexin and Sleep: Molecular, Functional and Clinical Aspects. Springer. pp. 165–. ISBN 978-3-319-23078-8.
- Jaime M. Monti; S. R. Pandi-Perumal; S. Chokroverty, M. A. Khanday (chapter author), R. K Yadav (chapter author), B. N. Mallick (chapter author) (24 October 2016). "Dopamine in REM Sleep Regulation". Dopamine and Sleep: Molecular, Functional, and Clinical Aspects. Springer. pp. 1–. ISBN 978-3-319-46437-4.

== See also ==
- Sleep and learning
- Dopamine
- Lucid dream
- Rapid eye movement sleep behavior disorder
