= D.N. De Homoeopathic Medical College & Hospital =

Hospital in Kolkata, West Bengal, India

- Type: Public Homeopathy Medical College & Hospital
- Established: 1927; 99 years ago
- Affiliations: WBUHS
- Principal: Subhasish Ganguly
- Location: 12, Gobindo Khatick Road, Kolkata, West Bengal, 700046, India; 22.5513985°N 88.3847024°E
- Website: http://www.dndeofficial.org/
- Location in Kolkata D.N. De Homoeopathic Medical College & Hospital (India)

D.N. De Homoeopathic Medical College & Hospital is a government homoeopathic medical college and hospital in Kolkata, West Bengal, India. It was established in 1927 and one of the oldest homeopathic medical colleges in India. The college is affiliated with the West Bengal University of Health Sciences. It is also recognized by the Central Council of Homoeopathy (CCH). It offers B.H.M.S. (Bachelor in Homoeopathic Medicine & Surgery) and M.D. (Homoeopathy) courses. This college was established as Dunham College of Homoeopathy in 1927, and later renamed as D.N. De Homoeopathic Medical College in the name of its founder D. N. De. in the January’ 1951.

== See also ==
- List of hospitals in India
- Calcutta National Medical College
- Calcutta Unani Medical College and Hospital
