= Dr. B. D. Jatti Homoeopathic Medical College, Hospital and Post Graduate Research Centre =

- Motto: Similia Similibus Curentur Heal and Comfort
- Motto in English: Let similar things be taken care of by similar things Heal and Comfort
- Established: 1992; 34 years ago
- Affiliations: Recognised by Central Council of Homoeopathy, New Delhi and affiliated to Rajiv Gandhi University of Health Sciences, Bengaluru, Karnataka
- Principal: Dr. Anand Kulkarni
- Academic staff: 53
- Location: Dharwad, Karnataka, India; 15.4505°N 75.0023°E
- Campus: Urban
- Website: bdjhmc.com
- Location in Karnataka Dr. B. D. Jatti Homoeopathic Medical College, Hospital and Post Graduate Research Centre (India)

Dr. B. D. Jatti Homoeopathic Medical College, Hospital and Post Graduate Research Centre is an organization under the Ministry of Ayurveda, Yoga & Naturopathy, Unani, Siddha, and Homeopathy (Department of AYUSH), Government of India. It is affiliated to the Rajiv Gandhi University of Health Sciences, Bengaluru, Karnataka and conducts the graduate degree course in Homeopathy and post-graduate degree courses in Homoeopathy. The college is attached with 60 bedded hospital.

== History ==
Dr. B. D. Jatti Homeopathic Medical College was started in 1992 with an initial intake of 25 students. Later it was taken over by Dakshin Bharat Hindi Prachar Sabha, Dharwad. The intake of the college was increased to 100 from the year 2003–04. It has separate hostels for boys and girls.

== Departments ==
The departments are Anatomy, Human Physiology and Biochemistry, Homoeopathic Pharmacy, Pathology, Forensic Medicine and Toxicology, Surgery, Obstetrics and Gynaecology, Practice of Medicine, Community Medicine, Organon of Medicine and Homeopathic Philosophy, Homeopathic Material Medica, and Repertory.

== B.H.M.S. degree course ==
It is of 4 1/2 years duration plus compulsory internship of one year after passing the Final Degree Examination.

== M.D(Hom.) - Post Graduate Degree Course ==
A three years course that includes one year of house job, where the student becomes a resident on the campus and receives training.

Specialization	Number of seats
Organon of Medicine & Homoeopathic Philosophy	6
Materia Medica	5
Repertory	3
Practice of Medicine	3

== See also ==
- Central Council of Homeopathy
- List of hospitals in India
