= Kharagpur Homoeopathic Medical College and Hospital =

- Type: Medical College and Hospital
- Established: 1971; 55 years ago
- Parent institution: Kharagpur Homoeopathic Medical Education Society
- Affiliations: WBUHS
- Principal: Dr. N. C. Ghosh
- Location: Kaushallya, Kharagpur, Paschim Medinipur district, West Bengal, 721301, India; 22.3321733°N 87.3432482°E
- Campus: Residential for both Boys and Girls
- Website: kharagpurhomoeopathicmedicalcollege.com
- Location in West Bengal Kharagpur Homoeopathic Medical College and Hospital (India)

Kharagpur Homoeopathic Medical College and Hospital, is a homeopathic medical college in Kharagpur, Paschim Medinipur district, West Bengal, India. The college is recognized by the Central Council of Homeopathy, New Delhi. This college is affiliated to the West Bengal University of Health Sciences. It offers the Bachelor of Homeopathic Medicine and Surgery (BHMS) degree course.

== See also ==
- Calcutta Homoeopathic Medical College & Hospital
- Calcutta Unani Medical College and Hospital
- List of hospitals in India
