= Mahesh Bhattacharya Homoeopathic Medical College and Hospital =

Homeopathic medical college in West Bengal, India

- Type: Medical College and Hospital
- Established: 1967; 59 years ago
- Affiliations: WBUHS
- Principal: Madhabananda Saha
- Location: Bholanath Chakraborty Sarani, Bantra, Dumurjala, Howrah, West Bengal, 711104, India; 22.586273°N 88.3090861°E
- Website: mbhmch.org/index.html
- Location within Kolkata Location within India

Mahesh Bhattacharya Homoeopathic Medical College and Hospital is a homeopathic medical college and hospital in Howrah, West Bengal, India. It was established in 1967 and is one of the oldest homeopathic medical colleges in India. The college is affiliated with the West Bengal University of Health Sciences and recognized by the Central Council of Homoeopathy (CCH), Ministry of Ayush. It offers B.H.M.S. (Bachelor in Homoeopathic Medicine & Surgery) and M.D. (Homoeopathy) courses.

== See also ==
- Calcutta Homoeopathic Medical College & Hospital
- Calcutta Unani Medical College and Hospital
- List of hospitals in India
