= Kolkata (disambiguation) =

Kolkata is the capital and the largest city of the Indian state of West Bengal, formerly known as Calcutta, the erstwhile capital of British India.

Kolkata may also refer to:

== Places ==
- Port of Kolkata
- Kolkata district
- Kolkata Metropolitan Area
  - Civic administration of Kolkata
  - Kolkata Municipal Corporation
- North Kolkata
- Kolkata West International City
- East Kolkata Wetlands

=== Constituencies ===
- Kolkata Port (Vidhan Sabha constituency)
- Kolkata Uttar (Lok Sabha constituency), Calcutta North
- Kolkata Dakshin (Lok Sabha constituency), Calcutta South

== Other uses ==
- Asia/Kolkata, the Kolkata time zone
- Kolkata railway station
- INS Kolkata, warship of the Indian Navy
- Kolkata-class destroyer of the Indian Navy
- Kolkata TV, 24hr Bengali TV news channel
- Kolkata Knight Riders, a T20 cricket team in the Indian Premier League

== See also ==
- Calcutta (disambiguation)
