= List of mayors of Kolkata =

Mayor of Kolkata
- Incumbent; Vacant since 5 June 2026
- Kolkata Municipal Corporation
- Style: Honourable Mayor
- Status: First Citizen of Kolkata
- Member of: Kolkata Municipal Corporation
- Seat: KMC, Headquarter
- Appointer: Electorate of Kolkata
- Term length: Five years, renewable
- Inaugural holder: Chittaranjan Das
- Formation: 16 April 1924; 102 years ago
- Deputy: Vacant
- Website: www.kmcgov.in

The Mayor of Kolkata is the chief executive of the Kolkata Municipal Corporation, one of the civic authorities in the Indian city of Kolkata. He is the First Citizen of the city of Kolkata. There have been 38 mayors of Kolkata in total till now since the first mayoral election in 1924.

== History ==
The first Kolkata Municipal Election was held on 16 April 1924, during the time of British India, under the Calcutta Municipal Act, 1923 - Bengal Act III of 1923. Mayors were elected on an annual basis. No corporation elections were held, therefore there was no mayor, from 1948 to 1952, since the Calcutta Municipal Corporation had been superseded by the State Government by The Corporation of Calcutta (Temporary Supersession) Act, 1948. In 1952 further mayors were appointed on an annual basis under the Calcutta Municipal Act, West Bengal Act XXXIII of 1951. There was another break in mayoral elections from 1972 during which time the Municipal Corporation had been superseded by the State Government on the Orders of the Governor. From 1985 mayors were elected on a five year term under the Calcutta Municipal Corporation Act, 1980 West Bengal Act LIX of 1980.

== List of mayors ==
List of Mayors of Kolkata
S. No.	Name	Portrait	Term			Party
Under Calcutta Municipal Act, 1923 – Bengal Act III of 1923
1	Chittaranjan Das		16 April 1924	16 July 1925	1 year, 91 days	Indian National Congress
2	Jatindra Mohan Sengupta		17 July 1925	3 February 1928	2 years, 201 days	Indian National Congress
3	Bijoy Kumar Basu		4 February 1928	9 April 1929	1 year, 64 days	Indian National Congress
(2)	Jatindra Mohan Sengupta		10 April 1929	21 August 1930	1 year, 133 days	Indian National Congress
4	Subhas Chandra Bose		22 August 1930	14 April 1931	235 days	Indian National Congress
5	Bidhan Chandra Roy		15 April 1931	8 April 1933	1 year, 358 days	Indian National Congress
6	Santosh Kumar Basu		9 April 1933	3 July 1934	1 year, 85 days	Indian National Congress
7	Nalini Ranjan Sarkar		4 July 1934	29 April 1935	299 days	Indian National Congress
8	Abul Kasem Fazlul Haque		30 April 1935	28 April 1936	364 days	Krishak Praja Party
9	Harisankar Paul		29 April 1936	27 April 1937	363 days	Indian National Congress
10	Sanat Kumar Roy Chowdhury		28 April 1937	28 April 1938	1 year, 0 days	Indian National Congress
11	A.K.M. Zakaria		29 April 1938	25 April 1939	361 days	Indian National Congress
12	Nishith Chandra Sen		26 April 1939	23 April 1940	363 days	Indian National Congress
13	Abdur Rahman Siddiqui		24 April 1940	27 April 1941	1 year, 3 days	All-India Muslim League
14	Phanindra Nath Brahma		28 April 1941	28 April 1942	1 year, 0 days	Indian National Congress
15	Hem Chandra Naskar		29 April 1942	29 April 1943	1 year, 0 days	Indian National Congress
16	Syed Badrudduja		30 April 1943	25 April 1944	361 days	All-India Muslim League
17	Anandi Lal Poddar		26 April 1944	26 April 1945	1 year, 0 days	Indian National Congress
18	Debendra Nath Mukherjee		27 April 1945	28 April 1946	1 year, 1 day	Indian National Congress
19	Syed Mohammed Usman		29 April 1946	28 April 1947	364 days	All India Muslim League
20	Sudhir Chandra Ray Chaudhuri		29 April 1947	23 March 1948	329 days	Indian National Congress
Under Calcutta Municipal Act, West Bengal Act XXXIII of 1951
21	Nirmal Chandra Chunder		1 May 1952	5 March 1953	308 days	Indian National Congress
22	Naresh Nath Mookherjee		6 March 1953	24 April 1955	2 years, 49 days	Indian National Congress
23	Satish Chandra Ghosh		25 April 1955	28 April 1957	2 years, 3 days	Indian National Congress
24	Triguna Sen		29 April 1957	7 April 1959	1 year, 343 days	Indian National Congress
25	Bejoy Kumar Banerjee		8 April 1959	5 April 1960	363 days	Indian National Congress
26	Keshab Chandra Basu		6 April 1960	27 April 1961	1 year, 21 days	Indian National Congress
27	Rajendranath Majumdar		28 April 1961	7 April 1963	1 year, 344 days	Indian National Congress
28	Chittaranjan Chatterjee		8 April 1963	25 April 1965	2 years, 17 days	Indian National Congress
29	Priti Kumar Roy Chowdhury		26 April 1965	23 April 1967	1 year, 362 days	Indian National Congress
30	Gobinda Chandra Dey		24 April 1967	12 June 1969	2 years, 49 days	Indian National Congress
31	Prasanta Sur		13 June 1969	22 April 1971	1 year, 313 days	Communist Party of India (Marxist)
32	Shyam Sundar Gupta		23 April 1971	22 March 1972	334 days	All India Forward Bloc
Under Calcutta Municipal Corporation Act, 1980 West Bengal Act LIX of 1980
33	Kamal Kumar Basu		30 July 1985	29 July 1990	4 years, 364 days	Communist Party of India (Marxist)
34	Prasanta Chatterjee		30 July 1990	11 July 2000	9 years, 347 days	Communist Party of India (Marxist)
35	Subrata Mukherjee		12 July 2000	4 July 2005	4 years, 357 days	All India Trinamool Congress
36	Bikash Ranjan Bhattacharya		5 July 2005	15 June 2010	4 years, 345 days	Communist Party of India (Marxist)
37	Sovan Chatterjee		16 June 2010	21 November 2018	8 years, 159 days	All India Trinamool Congress
38	Firhad Hakim		22 November 2018	5 June 2026	7 years, 195 days	All India Trinamool Congress
