= NHMC =

NHMC may stand for:

- National Hispanic Media Coalition, a media advocacy and civil rights organization for the advancement of Latinos
- Natural History Museum of Crete, a natural history museum that operates under the auspices of the University of Crete
- Nehru Homeopathic Medical College, a homeopathic medical college located in New Delhi
