= Sainthia =

Sainthia Nandipur
- City
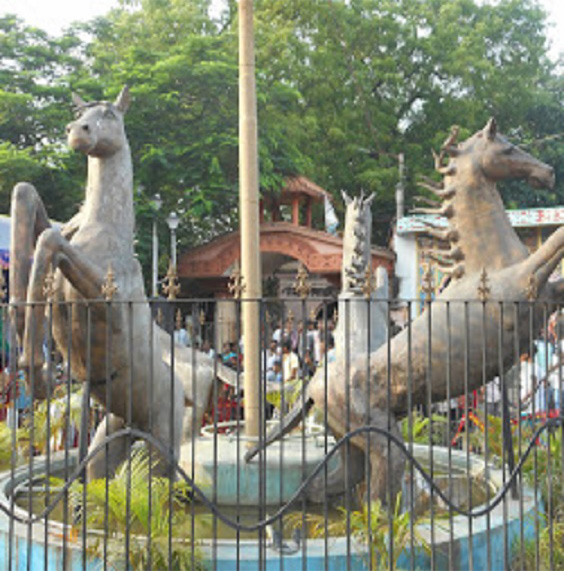
- Statue of horses at the Nandikeshwari Temple complex
- Nicknames: Business City; Business Capital of Birbhum
- Location in West Bengal, India Sainthia (India) Sainthia (Asia) Sainthia (Earth)
- Coordinates: 23.9451°N 87.6803°E
- Country: India
- State: West Bengal
- District: Birbhum
- Established: 1987

Government
  - Type: Municipality
  - Body: Sainthia Municipality
  - Chairman: Biplab Dutta
  - Vice Chairman: Kazi Kamal Hosein

Area
  - Total: 10 km^{2} (3.9 sq mi)
- Elevation: 54.94 m (180.2 ft)

Population (2011)
  - Total: 44,601
  - Rank: 4th, Birbhum District
  - Density: 4,460/km^{2} (11,600/sq mi)
- Demonym: Sainthian / Sainthiabashi

Languages
  - Official: Bengali, English
- Time zone: UTC+5:30 (IST)
- PIN: 731234
- Telephone/STD code: 03462
- Vehicle registration: WB 54
- Literacy: 79.50%
- Lok Sabha constituency: Birbhum
- Vidhan Sabha constituency: Sainthia
- Website: sainthiamunicipality.com

Sainthia (formerly Nandipur) is a city and a municipality in Suri Sadar subdivision of Birbhum district in the Indian state of West Bengal. The city is known as business city of Birbhum district. The city is under the jurisdiction of Sainthia police station. Sainthia is the fourth most populous city in Birbhum district and 95th most populous city in West Bengal. The city covers an area of 10 km^{2} and had a population of 44,601 in 2011. Located on the banks of Mayurakshi River, Sainthia has been a major human settlement. The city is famous for Nandikeshwari Temple, one of the Shakta pithas in Indian subcontinent.

== Etymology ==
It is believed that the name Sainthia is derived from 'Saaita', a term used in 'Khero Khata' (Business Book) by the merchants of Sainthia after worshiping Goddess Nandikeshwari in Poila Boishakh and Vijaya Dashami.

Nandipur was the ancient name of Sainthia. The name Nandipur was originated from the famous temple of Nandikeshwari. The word Nandi comes from Nandikeshwari Temple and the word Pur is a Sanskrit term used for city. Together these words created Nandipur.

== History ==
Sainthia was a small village. Urbanization of this area gained momentum in the recent past, when construction work of the Sahibganj loop line and a bridge over the Mayurakshi River started. Construction of the Khana-Rajmahal section of Sahibganj Loop was completed in October 1859. Construction of the Sainthia railway station was done as part of building the entire line. This large project brought people from different corners of the country to assemble and settle here. Sainthia, an old village trade center, a place of pilgrimage has been emerged into a municipal city in the year 1987.

== Geography ==
Cities and towns in Suri Sadar subdivision of Birbhum district
M: municipal city/ town, CT: census town, R: rural/ urban centre, B: Barrage.
Owing to space constraints in the small map, the actual locations in a larger map may vary slightly

=== Location ===
Sainthia is located at 23.9451°N 87.6803°E. It has an average elevation of 54 m (177 ft). The city is situated in the south bank of Mayurakshi River. The soil is generally alluvial and fertile. There was a rich reservoir of groundwater but this stands somewhat depleted due to overuse.

=== Climate ===
Sainthia's climate is classified as tropical. In winter, there is much less rainfall in Sainthia than in summer. The average annual temperature is 26.3 °C in Sainthia. The temperature goes very high and it is very humid in summer and quite cold in winter. In a year, the average rainfall is 1328 mm.

=== Urban Structure ===
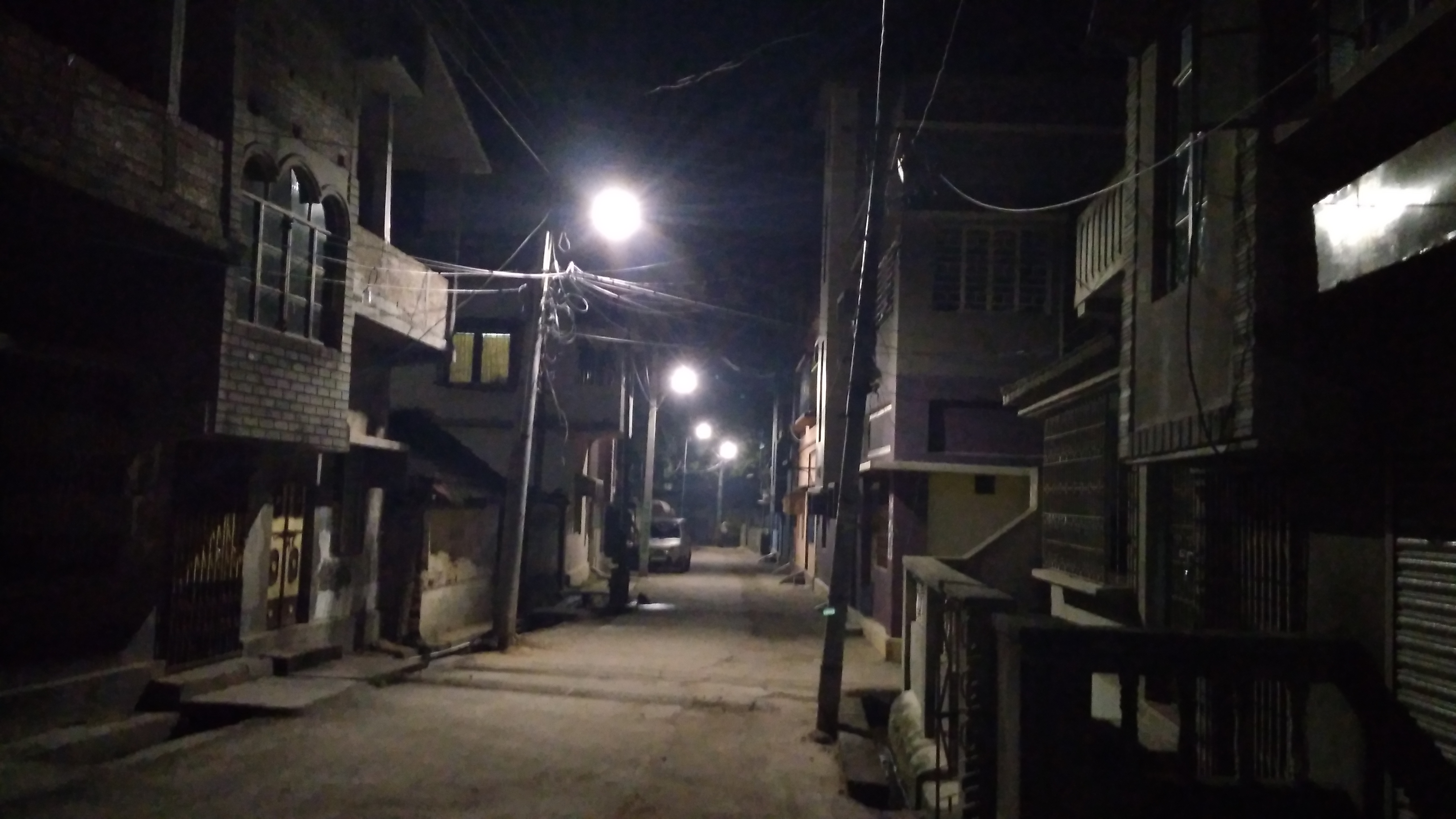
An empty narrow street at night in Sainthia.

The Sainthia municipality area spread over 10 km^{2} (3.86 sq mi) and comprises 16 wards. The north–south dimension of the city is comparatively narrow, stretching from the Mayurakshi River in the north to roughly Pariharpur Village in the south—a span of 2–3 km. The east–west dimension of the city is widest with the span of 5–6 km.

== Demographics ==
=== Historical Population ===
In 1901, according to L. S. S. O'Molley's Bengal District Gazetters, Sainthia had a population of 2622 and in 1911 Sainthia had a population of 3551.

Historical population
Year	Pop.	±%
1901	2,622	—
1911	3,551	+35.4%
1941	7,584	+113.6%
1951	8,704	+14.8%
1961	12,096	+39.0%
1971	15,929	+31.7%
1981	24,081	+51.2%
1991	30,024	+24.7%
2001	39,145	+30.4%
2011	44,601	+13.9%
Sources: 1901-1911, 1941-2011

=== Latest Population ===
As of 2011 Census of India, the Sainthia Municipality has a population of 44,601, of which 22,856 are males while 21,745 are females. The population of children under age 6 is 4511, which is 10.11% of the total population of Sainthia. In Sainthia, the female sex ratio is 951, against the state average of 950. The child sex ratio is around 880, compared to the West Bengal state average of 956. The literacy rate of Sainthia is 79.50%, higher than state average of 76.26%. Male literacy is around 84.70% while female literacy is 74.08%. Out of the total population, 16,485 were engaged in work or business activity. Of this, 13,481 were males while 3,004 were females. In the census survey, a worker is defined as a person who does business, job, service, cultivator, or labour activity. Of the total 16,485 working population, 92.97% were engaged in main work while 7.03% were engaged in marginal work. Sainthia has over 10,229 houses.

Religion in Sainthia
Religion	Percent
Hinduism	86.96%
Islam	11.38%
Christian	0.08%
Jain	1.37%
Sikh	0.02%
Buddhist	0.02%
Others	0.05%
Not Stated	0.13%

Ward number 16 is the most populous ward with population of 3814 and ward number 4 is the least populous ward with population of 1638.

== Economy ==
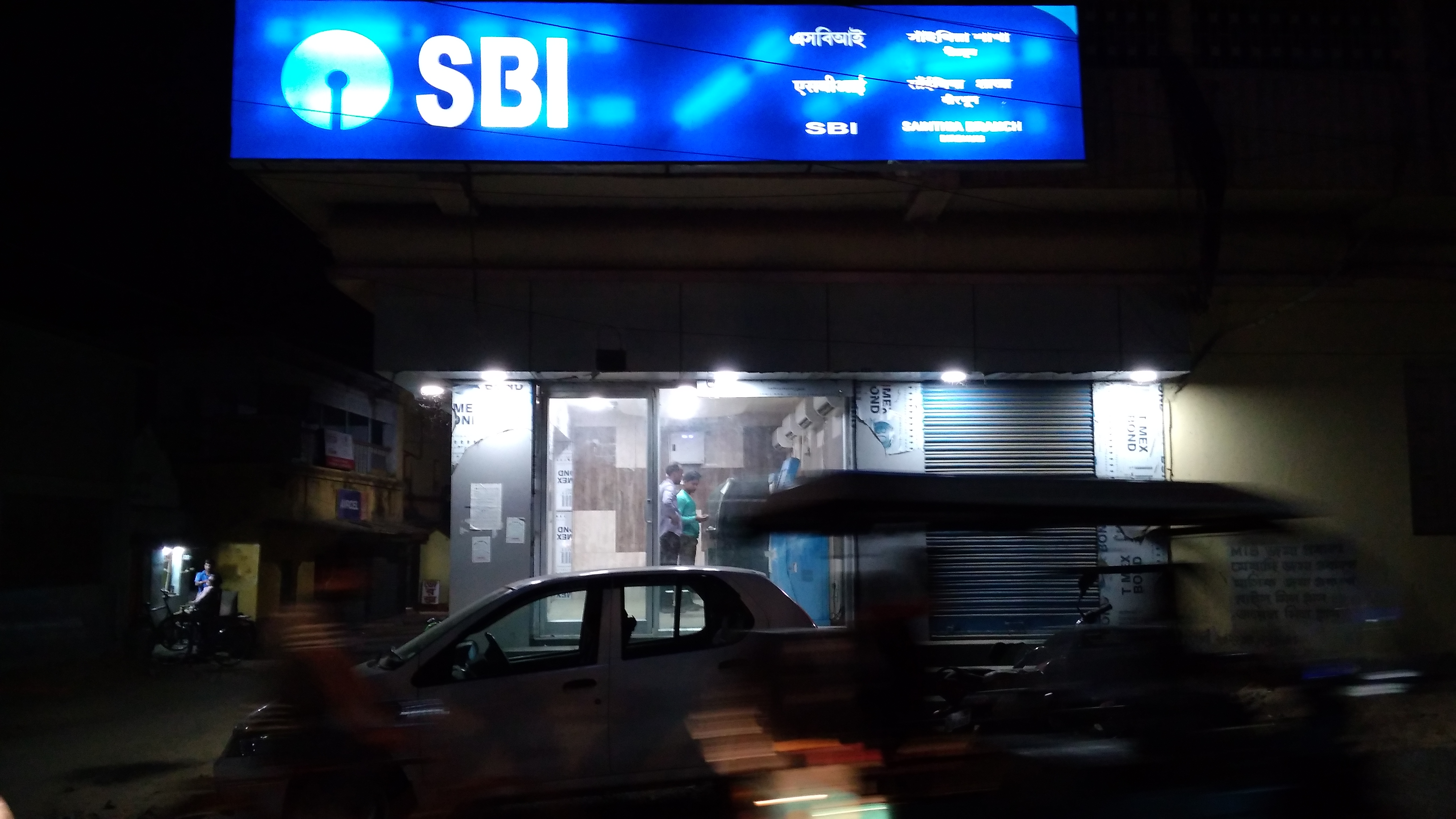
State Bank of India branch at Sandhani More in Sainthia.

Sainthia is an economically important city and one of the busiest business hubs in the middle part of West Bengal. Sainthia city is the main trading centre in the district. The economy is based on agricultural products and their allied businesses. Rice mills, mustard oil mills, bran oil mills, puffed rice mills, jaggery/gur and galvanized wire product units and other businesses run here. Sainthia is the leader in edible oil industry in Birbhum and one of the leading edible oil producers in West Bengal. There are 10 edible oil mills in Sainthia out of which 9 are Mustard oil mills and 1 is Rice Bran oil mill. The economy of Sainthia stands tall due to the sales of agricultural products. The city is known as an export and import centre for cottage industry and agricultural based different goods. The hinterland of business of Sainthia spreads up to the districts of Jharkhand in the west and Assam in the north east. The city is well connected to different parts of the country. From the city, the agricultural products are exported to different parts of the State and also to different parts of the Eastern India through high roads and railroads. That makes the city the business centre of all sorts of goods distribution and transportation. Its socio-economical status is quite strong and education ratio is steadily increasing.

Sainthia is an important centre for banking and finance. There are 14 bank branches in the city. 10 of them are public sector banks and remaining 4 are private sector banks.

== Industrial Legacy ==
Sainthia's industrial prominence owes much to the Chandra family, who established the iconic "Lion Marka" (Lion Brand), the coconut oil manufactured and processed in a factory located beside the Mayurakshi River. It gained widespread popularity across the state and nationwide for nearly 45 years. However, operations ceased in 1992.

== Transport ==
=== Road ===
The National Highway 114 and State Highway 11 runs across the city. These highways links important cities and towns in West Bengal.

Public transport systems in Sainthia include the Government and private buses, electric rickshaws, taxis and auto rickshaws.

=== Air ===
The nearest domestic airport is Kazi Nazrul Islam International Airport. The airport is roughly 74 kilometers from central Sainthia.

=== Railway ===
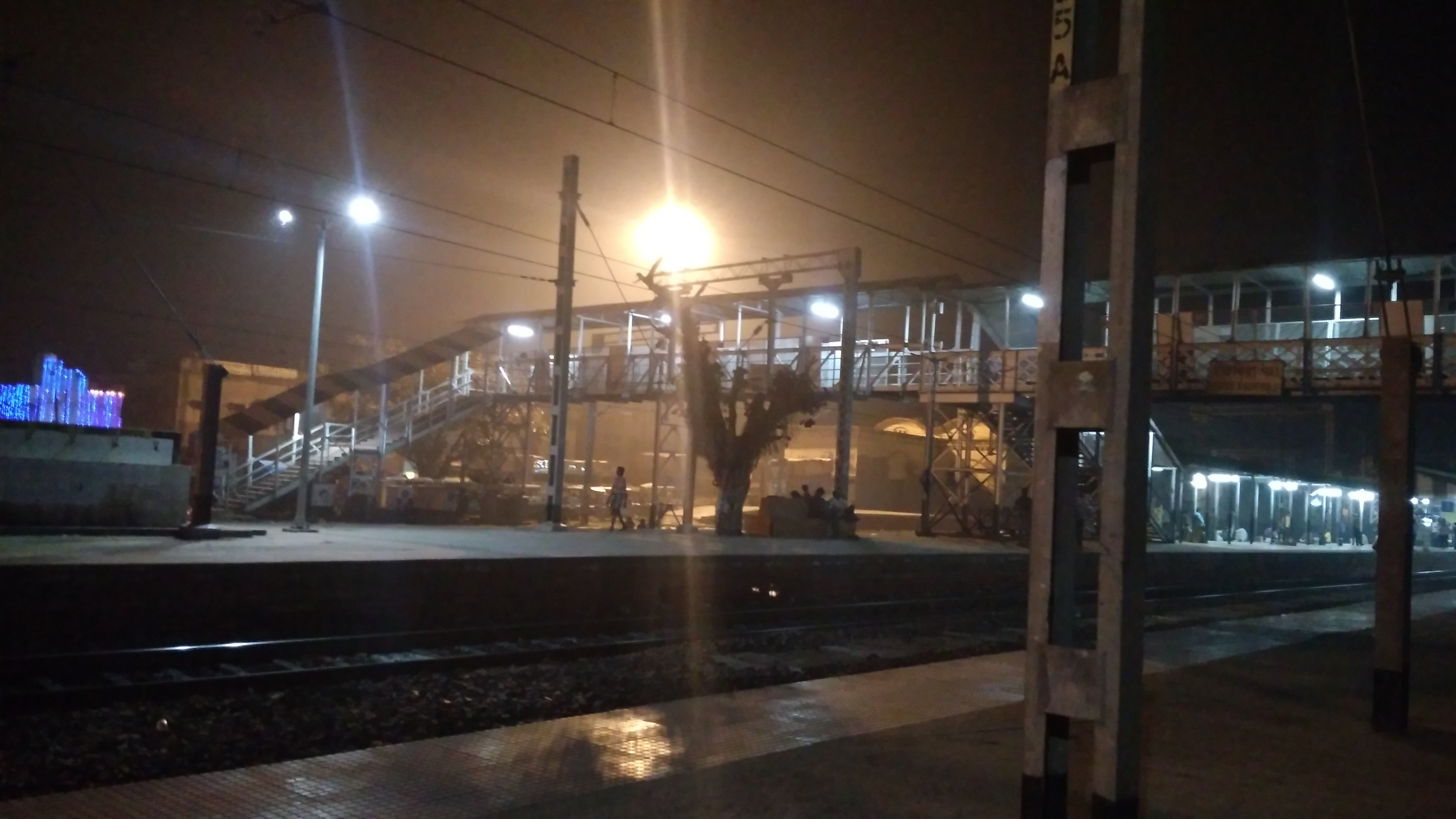
Sainthia Junction Railway Station.

Sainthia railway station serves the entire city and is one of the important railway station of Birbhum district. It also serves as the originating station of 4 MEMU Locals. The Sainthia railway station connects to both of Kolkata's two busy rail terminals, Howrah railway station and Sealdah railway station. It is the junction from where the way to Andal divides from the line from Rampurhat to Howrah Railway Station and Sealdah Railway Station.

=== Accidents ===
On 19 July 2010, at 02:13, the Sainthia train collision occurred, when Bananchal express was crashed by Uttarbanga express at platform no. 4.

== Healthcare ==
The city has 1 government funded State General Hospital, 8 private hospitals and 1 veterinary hospital.

== Tourism ==
Sainthia is known for its temples, including the famous Nandikeshwari Temple.

== Education ==
=== Colleges ===
There are two colleges in Sainthia:

- Abhedananda Mahavidyalaya -a general stream college under the University of Burdwan. Established in 1964.
- Birbhum Vivekananda Homoeopathic Medical College & Hospital -Established in 1972.

=== High schools ===
- Sainthia High School
- Sainthia Town High School is a boys' only high school.
- Shashibhushan Dutta Girls' High School
- Jogeshwari Dutta Girls' High School
- Sainthia Paharhi Baba Vidyapth
- Gitanjali Public School
- Rastravhasa High School
- Muradihi Jr. High School

=== Primary schools ===
There are 30 primary schools in Sainthia.

=== Library ===
There is one government-sponsored public library in Sainthia.

== Sports ==
=== Stadiums ===
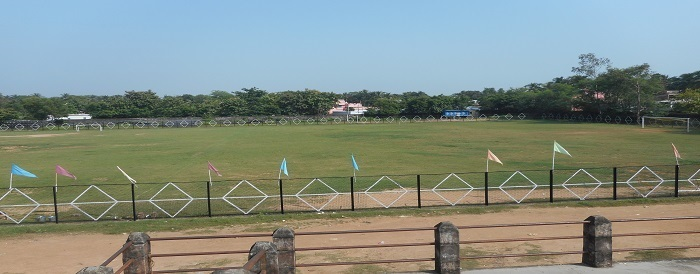
Kamodakinkar Stadium

The Kamodakinkar Stadium (Jalibagan) is a football and a cricket stadium at Vivekananda Pally, Sainthia, operated by Sainthia Sports Association.

== Notable people ==
Ananda Mohan Chakrabarty (born 1938), microbiologist and scientist

== Culture and festivals ==
Sainthia is influenced much by the culture of West Bengal. Festivals in Sainthia are inherited by the entire state of West Bengal. The language that is generally spoken here are Bengali and Hindi. However, people from other parts of India who have settled in Sainthia, obviously speak other languages. The festivals that are most commonly celebrated are the Durga Puja, Kaali Puja, Diwali, Saraswati Puja, Chhath Puja, Holi, Christmas. Also, Ganesh Puja is done during Sankashti Chaturthi.

The festivals like Durga Puja is sincerely celebrated throughout the city of Sainthia by the local people. Though this festival is celebrated throughout India, the people of Sainthia give more importance to this festival.
