= Nandikeshwari temple =

- নন্দিকেশ্বরী মন্দির nondikeśśorī mondir
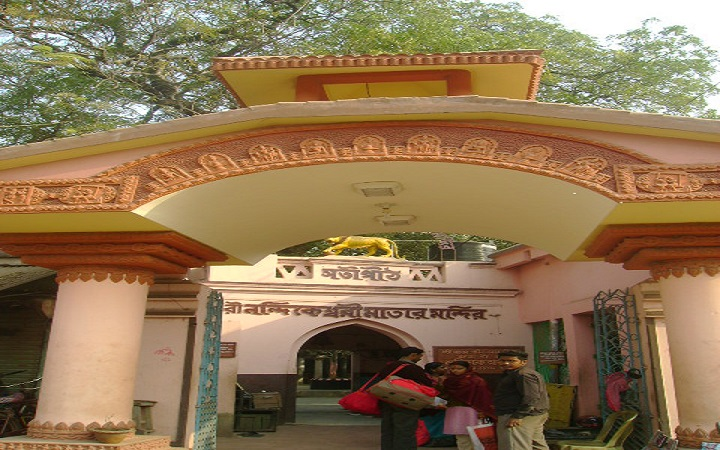
- Main Gate of Nandikeshwari temple

- Location in West Bengal

Religion
- Affiliation: Hinduism
- District: Birbhum District
- Deity: Sati

Location
- Location: Nandikeshwari Tala, Sainthia
- State: West Bengal
- Country: India
- Coordinates: 23°56′57.1″N 87°40′54.8″E

Architecture
- Completed: 1913
- Elevation: 54 m (177 ft)

Nandikeshwari temple, also known as Nandikeshwari Tala, is in Sainthia City of West Bengal.
