= Jugal Kishore (physician) =

Indian homoeopathic physician (1915–2012)

- Born: 1915; India
- Died: 23 January 2012 (aged 96–97); New Delhi
- Occupation: Homoeopathic physician
- Awards: Padma Shri
- Website: Official web site

Jugal Kishore (1915–2012) was an Indian homoeopathic physician and the founder Director of Nehru Homoeopathic Medical College and Hospital, New Delhi, a Government of Delhi undertaking. He was honored by the Government of India, in 2012, with the fourth highest Indian civilian award of Padma Shri.

== Biography ==
Jugal Kishore was born in 1915 in the British India. He did his graduate studies at the Foreman Christian College, Lahore, Punjab University and was preparing to appear for the Indian Civil Service examinations when he contracted a disease which rendered him bedridden for over a year. During the convalescing period, he is reported to have chanced upon a homoeopathic book which helped him in self medication and a reported cure from his illness. This is known to have prompted him to take up studies on homoeopathy.

Kishore graduated in homoeopathic medicine from the Calcutta Homoeopathic College, West Bengal and started his practice in 1945 to begin a career which spanned for over 65 years. During this period, Kishore served as the honorary physician to the President of India for four tenures, honorary homoeopathic advisor to the Government of India once and was the Chairman of Homoeopathic Pharmacopoeia Committee of India. When the Government of Delhi established Nehru Homoeopathic Medical College and Hospital in New Delhi, Kishore was made its first director. He was the president of the Asian Homoeopathic Medical League (AHML) and a member of the national executive committee of the International Homoeopathic Medical Organization, Geneva. He was a member of the Indian delegation for two sessions of International Homoeopathic Congress in 1973 and 1976 and was the president of the Central Council of Homoeopathy.

Jugal Kishore is known to be the creator of Kishore Cards, a punch card system for Homoeopathic Reportorial analysis on which he has authored three books, Kishore Card Repertory, Integrated Repertory - Mind and Generalities and Evolution of Repertories. He is also credited with several innovative homoeopathic treatment protocols.

Jugal Kishore was married to Sharda who preceded him in death, and the couple had two sons. Dr. Rajeev Kishore, a pediatric allergist, who practices in Akron, Ohio, and Dr. Arvind Kishore, following the path of his father, is a homoeopathic practitioner. Jugal Kishore died on 23 January 2012, two days prior to the announcement of his nomination for the civilian award of Padma Shri which was announced on 25 January 2012.

== See also ==
- Central Council of Homoeopathy
