= Midnapore Homoeopathic Medical College and Hospital =

Hospital in West Bengal, India

- Type: Government Homoeopathic medical college and hospital
- Established: 1945; 81 years ago
- Affiliations: WBUHS
- Principal: Srimanta Saha
- Location: Homoeopathy College Lane, Midnapore, Paschim Medinipur, West Bengal, 721101, India; 22.4203633°N 87.3241187°E
- Website: www.mhmch.org
- Location within West Bengal Location within India

Midnapore Homoeopathic Medical College and Hospital (MHMC&H) is a homeopathic medical college and hospital in Midnapore, West Bengal, India. This college was established on 3 December 1945. It is one of the oldest running homeopathic institutions in India. It offers the Bachelor of Homeopathic Medicine and Surgery (BHMS) degree course. The college is recognized by the Central Council of Homoeopathy (CCH), Ministry of Ayush and affiliated with the West Bengal University of Health Sciences.

== See also ==
- Midnapore Medical College and Hospital
- List of hospitals in India
