= Homoeopathy Central Council Act, 1973 =

Repealed act of the parliament of India

Parliament of India
- Long title: An Act to provide for the constitution of a Central Council of Homoeopathy and the maintenance of a Central Register of Homoeopathy and for matters connected therewith.
- Citation: Act No. 59 of 1973
- Territorial extent: India
- Enacted by: Parliament of India
- Enacted: 19 December 1973
- Commenced: 1 August 1974
- Repealed: 5 July 2021

Amended by
- Delegated Legislation Provisions (Amendment) Act, 1983; Homoeopathy Central Council (Amendment) Act, 2002; Homoeopathy Central Council (Amendment) Act, 2018; Homoeopathy Central Council (Amendment) Act, 2019; Homoeopathy Central Council (Amendment) Act, 2020

Repealed by
- National Commission for Homoeopathy Act, 2020
- Status: Repealed

The Homoeopathy Central Council Act, 1973, (Act 59 of 1973), is a now-repealed Act of the Parliament of India to primarily structure the role of the Central Council of Homoeopathy and to enable the regularization of the maintenance of a central register of issues and entities related to the field of homoeopathy. It included five chapters when it was initially passed. The Act was amended in December 2002, via Homoeopathy Central Council Amendment Act, 2002 (No. 51 of 2002). The Act was replaced by the National Commission for Homoeopathy Act, 2020 with effect from 5 July 2021.

== Chapters ==
- Chapter I: Contained the introduction to the Act and objectives intended to be achieved.
- Chapter II: Contained the actual Central Council Act and the committees proposed to be formed.
- Chapter III: Contained details of how institutions related to teaching streams like Ayurveda, Unani medicine, Siddhi and their associate medical qualifications could be recognised.
- Chapter IV: Contained the national central register detailing various issues and entities connected with the area of homoeopathy.
- Chapter V: Other issues of significance not mentioned directly within the previous chapters.
