= Gabriel Marin (musician) =

American fusion musician and guitarist

Gabriel Akhmad Marin is an American fusion musician, guitarist and a founding member of the fusion band Consider the Source. He is known as one of the notable fretless guitar players and dutar experts with a special technique and speed and a blending of Western, Asian and Middle East classical fusion. He released a solo album, Ruminate in 2021 which appeared on World Music Charts.

== Career ==
A native of New York with North Caucasus and Balkan heritage, Marin started his career on piano and switched to guitar at the age of 16. He studied classic music with David Fiuczynski at Hunter College where he earned a bachelor's degree and was mentored by Indian classical musician Debashish Bhattacharya. Marin traveled through rural Turkey to learn old instrumental styles.

In 2004, Marin played alongside Justin Ahiyon at a jam session and discovered their musical compatibility. Ahiyon then introduced John Ferrara whom he had been playing together since childhood and the three musicians formed the band - Consider the Source. Marin plays a double-neck guitar customized with MIDI pickups and a fretless neck. He employs sweep picking and various synthesized instruments on his guitar which he controls with three pedalboards.

In 2025, Marin announced a new band – Social Assassin. His music is a mix of Turkish, Bulgarian, Persian, Azerbaijani, North and South India styles with jazz and fusion and filtering it through heavy, rock and psychedelic sounds and approaches. He is a practicing Sufi.
