= Birbhum Vivekananda Homoeopathic Medical College & Hospital =

- Type: Private Homeopathy Medical College & Hospital
- Established: 1972; 54 years ago
- Principal: Tapan Kumar Chatterjee
- Address: Hahnemann Sarani, Ward Number 1, Sainthia, 731234, India
- Affiliations: WBUHS
- Website: www.bvhmch.com

Birbhum Vivekananda Homoeopathic Medical College & Hospital is a homoeopathic medical college and hospital in Sainthia, Birbhum District, West Bengal, India. It was established in 1972 by Ashok Kumar Bose. It offers the Bachelor of Homeopathic Medicine and Surgery (BHMS) courses. It is recognized by the Central Council of Homoeopathy (CCH), Ministry of Ayush and affiliated with the West Bengal University of Health Sciences.
