= Ananda Mohan Chakrabarty =

Indian-American microbiologist (1938–2020)

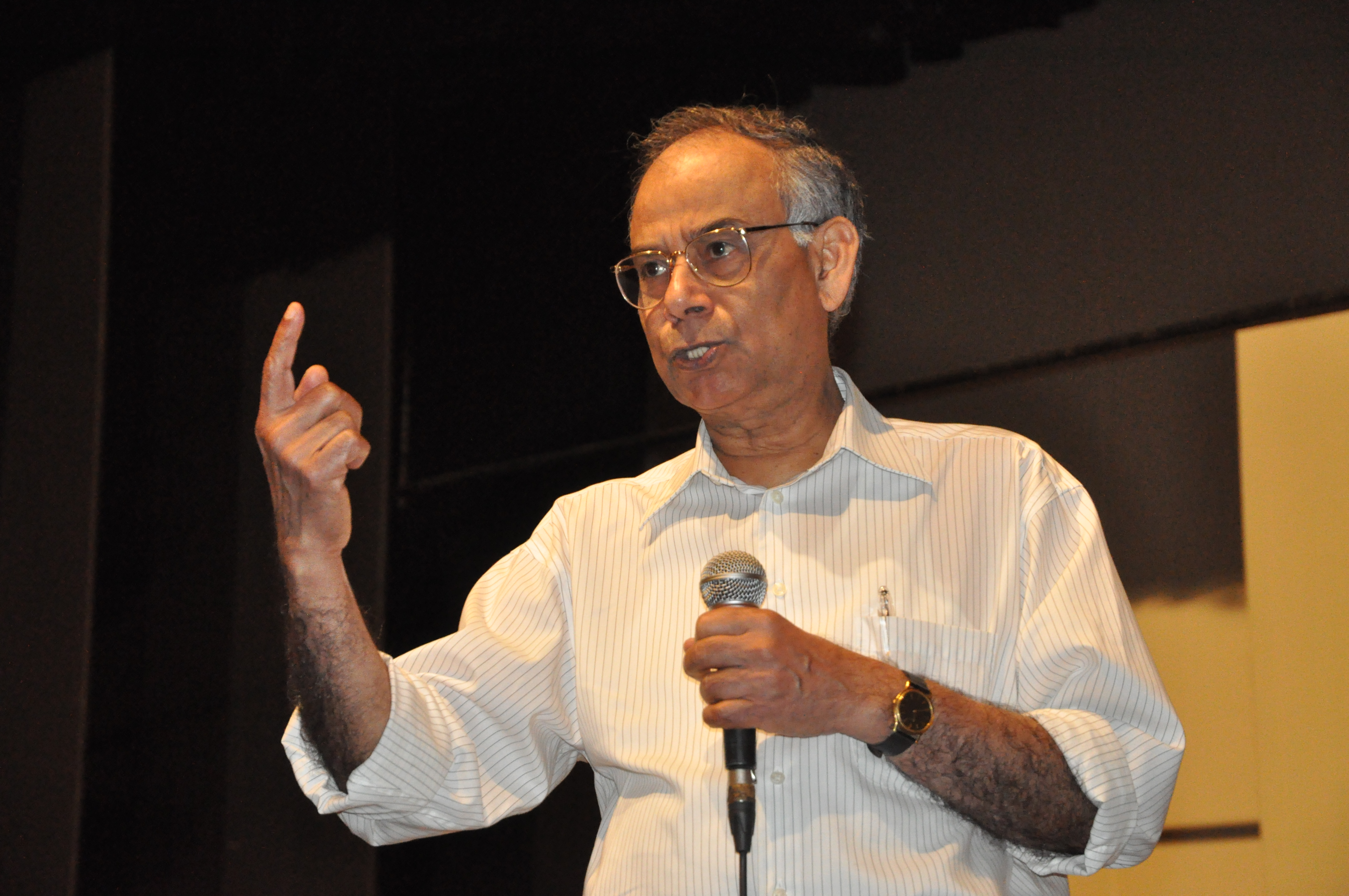
- Ananda Mohan Chakrabarty at Science City, Kolkata on 8 November 2009
- Born: 4 April 1938; Sainthia, Bengal Presidency, British India
- Died: 10 July 2020 (aged 82); Chicago, Illinois, US
- Education: University of Calcutta
- Known for: Genetically engineering a Pseudomonas bacterium
- Scientific career
- Fields: Microbiology

Ananda Mohan Chakrabarty (4 April 1938 – 10 July 2020) was an Indian American microbiologist, scientist, and researcher, most notable for his work in directed evolution and his role in developing a genetically engineered organism using plasmid transfer while working at GE, the patent for which led to landmark Supreme Court case, Diamond v. Chakrabarty. He has been credited as having laid the foundations of modern biotech industry.

== Early life ==
Ananda (generally called "Al" by scientific colleagues) Chakrabarty was born in Sainthia on 4 April 1938. He attended Sainthia High School, Ramakrishna Mission Vidyamandira and St. Xavier's College, Calcutta—in that order—during the course of his undergraduate education. Prof. Chakrabarty received his PhD. from the University of Calcutta in Kolkata, West Bengal in 1965.

== Scientific work ==
Prof. Chakrabarty genetically engineered a new species of Pseudomonas bacteria ("the oil-eating bacteria") in 1971 while working for the Research & Development Center at General Electric Company in Schenectady, New York.

At the time, four known species of oil-metabolizing bacteria were known to exist, but when introduced into an oil spill, they competed with each other, limiting the amount of crude oil that they degraded. The genes necessary to degrade oil were carried on plasmids, which could be transferred among species. By irradiating the transformed organism with UV light after plasmid transfer, Prof. Chakrabarty discovered a method for genetic cross-linking that fixed all four plasmid genes in place and produced a new, stable, bacterial species (now called Pseudomonas putida) capable of consuming oil one or two orders of magnitude faster than the previous four strains of oil-eating microbes. The new microbe, which Chakrabarty called "multiplasmid hydrocarbon-degrading Pseudomonas," could digest about two-thirds of the hydrocarbons that would be found in a typical oil spill.

The bacteria drew international attention when he applied for a patent—the first U.S. patent for a genetically modified organism. (U.S. utility patents had been granted to living organisms before, including two pure bacterial cultures, patented by Louis Pasteur. Chakrabarty's modified bacterium was granted a patent in the U.K. before the U.S. patent came through.) He was initially denied the patent by the Patent Office because the patent code was thought to preclude patents on living organisms. The United States Court of Customs and Patent Appeals overturned the decision in Chakrabarty's favor, writing:

...the fact that micro-organisms are alive is without legal significance for purposes of patent law.

Sidney A. Diamond, Commissioner of Patents and Trademarks, then appealed to the Supreme Court. The Supreme Court case was argued on 17 March 1980 and decided on 16 June 1980. This patent was granted by the U.S. Supreme Court (Diamond v. Chakrabarty), in a 5–4 decision, when it determined:

A live, human-made micro-organism is patentable subject matter under [Title 35 U.S.C.] 101. Respondent's micro-organism constitutes a "manufacture" or "composition of matter" within that statute.

Prof. Chakrabarty's research has since paved the way for many patents on genetically modified micro-organisms and other life forms, and catapulted him into the international spotlight.

== Last work ==
His lab worked on elucidating the role of bacterial cupredoxins and cytochromes in cancer regression and arresting cell cycle progression. These proteins have been formerly known for their involvement in bacterial electron transport. He isolated a bacterial protein, azurin, with potential antineoplastic properties. He expanded his lab's work to include multiple microbiological species, including Neisseria, Plasmodia, and Acidithiobacillus ferrooxidans. In 2001, Prof. Chakrabarty founded a company, CDG Therapeutics, (incorporated in Delaware) which holds proprietary information related to five patents generated by his work at the University of Illinois at Chicago. The University of Illinois owns the rights to the patents, but has issued exclusive licences to CDG Therapeutics.

In 2008, Prof. Chakrabarty co-founded a second biopharmaceutical discovery company, Amrita Therapeutics Ltd., registered in Ahmedabad, Gujarat, to develop therapies, vaccines, and diagnostics effective against cancers and/or other major public health threats derived from bacterial products found in the human body. Amrita Therapeutics Ltd. received initial funding in late 2008 from Gujarat Venture Finance Limited, and later received a grant for a two-year research program in 2010 from the Indian Department of Biotechnology under the Biotechnology Industry Promotion Program (BIPP).

== Academic career ==
Chakrabarty was a Distinguished University Professor in the Department of Microbiology and Immunology in the University of Illinois at Chicago College of Medicine. Ananda Chakrabarty has been an advisor to judges, governments, and the UN. As one of the founding members of a United Nations Industrial Development Organization committee that proposed the establishment of the International Centre for Genetic Engineering and Biotechnology, he has been a member of its Council of Scientific Advisors ever since. He has served the U.S. government as a member of NIH Study Sections, a member of the Board on Biology of the National Academy of Sciences, and the Committee on Biotechnology of the National Research Council.

He has also served the Stockholm Environment Institute of Sweden. He has been on the scientific advisory boards of many academic institutions such as the Michigan Biotechnology Institute, the Montana State University Center for Biofilm Engineering, the Center for Microbial Ecology at the Michigan State University, and the Canadian Bacterial Diseases Network based in Calgary, Alberta, Canada. Dr. Chakrabarty has also served as a member of the NATO Industrial Advisory Group based in Brussels, Belgium. He was a member of the board of directors of Einstein Institute for Science, Health and the Courts, where he participated in judicial education.

For his work in genetic engineering technology, he was awarded the civilian Padma Shri by the government of India in 2007.
