= Calcutta National Medical College =

Public medical college and tertiary teaching hospital in Kolkata, West Bengal, India

Calcutta National Medical College and Hospital
- Recognition: NMC; INC
- Type: Public medical college and hospital
- Established: April 14, 1921; 105 years ago (as National Medical Institute) c. 1948; 78 years ago (as CNMCH)
- Academic affiliations: West Bengal University of Health Sciences
- Principal: Dr. Susmita Bhattacharya
- Location: Kolkata, West Bengal, India; 22°32′47″N 88°22′12″E
- Campus: 32 Gorachand Road, Beniapukur, Kolkata-700014
- Website: www.cnmckolkata.com
- Government of West Bengal

Organisation
- Type: Teaching hospital
- Affiliated university: West Bengal University of Health Sciences

Services
- Standards: NMC
- Emergency department: Level II Trauma Center
- Beds: 1,470

Helipads
- Helipad: No

Calcutta National Medical College and Hospital (CNMCH), colloquially known as Chittaranjan Hospital, is a public medical college and hospital located in Kolkata, West Bengal, India. It was established by the amalgamation of the National Medical Institute and Calcutta Medical Institute.

== Establishment ==
The Calcutta National Medical College has its origin in the "National Medical Institute" or "Jatiya Ayurbigyan Vidyalaya" on 14 April 1921, founded as a product of the Non-cooperation movement. It was inaugurated by Netaji Subhas Chandra Bose. The College is locally known as Chittaranjan Hospital. Established in 1948, the institute was nationalized and taken under the Ministry of Health & Family Welfare (West Bengal) in 1967. The college is accredited by the National Medical Commission (NMC). It was affiliated with the University of Calcutta till 2003. It is currently affiliated to the West Bengal University of Health Sciences (WBUHS). The founder principal of the college was Dr. Sundari Mohan Das.

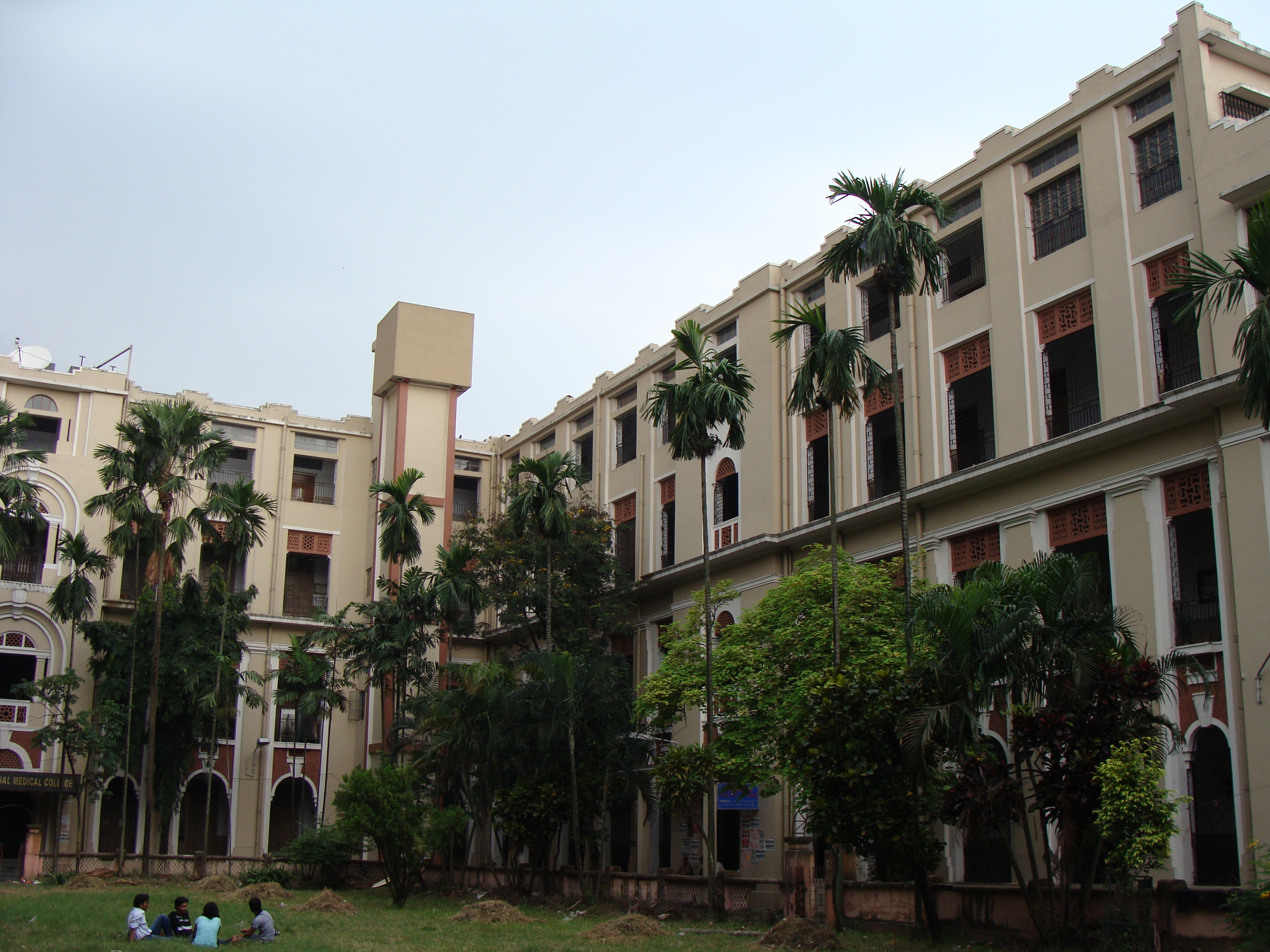
Academic Section of Calcutta National Medical College and Hospital

== Annual intake ==
- Paramedical – 73 ( under State Medical Faculty of West Bengal)
- Undergraduate
  - MBBS: 250
  - Nursing: 50
- Post Graduate
  - Degree: 122
  - Diploma: 4
- Post Doctoral (Super-specialization): 7

== Departments ==
CNMC consists of following departments:

=== Pre-clinical ===
- Department of Anatomy
- Department of Physiology
- Department of Biochemistry

=== Para-clinical ===
- Department of Pathology
- Department of Microbiology
- Department of Pharmacology
- Department of Forensic and State Medicine
- Department of Community Medicine/PSM

=== Clinical ===
- Department of Ophthalmology
- Department of ENT/Otorhinolaryngology
- Department of General Surgery
- Department of Orthopaedics
- Department of Gynaecology and Obstetrics
- Department of General Medicine
- Department of Paediatrics
- Department of Dermatology
- Department of Pulmonary/Chest Medicine
- Department of Physical Medicine & Rehabilitation
- Department of Dentistry
- Department of Radiology
- Department of Radiotherapy
- Department of Psychiatry
- Department of Anaesthesiology
- Department of Cardiothoracic and Vascular Surgery
- Department of Paediatric Surgery
- Department of Plastic and Reconstructive Surgery
- Department of Neurosurgery
- Department of Urology
- Department of Neuro Medicine
- Department of Cardiology

== Hospital ==
Calcutta National Medical College (CNMC) is popularly known as Chittaranjan Hospital. The second campus of CNMC previously Calcutta Pavlov Hospital houses the psychiatry department. CNMC&H is one of the biggest government hospitals in West Bengal having extensive OPD, day care and indoor patient care services with more than 8,000 patients attending OPD every day. Total available bed strength is 1470. Calcutta National Medical College and Hospital ranked country’s best in maternity care and received the LaQshya Certificate from the Union health ministry, becoming the first medical institute in West Bengal to get it.

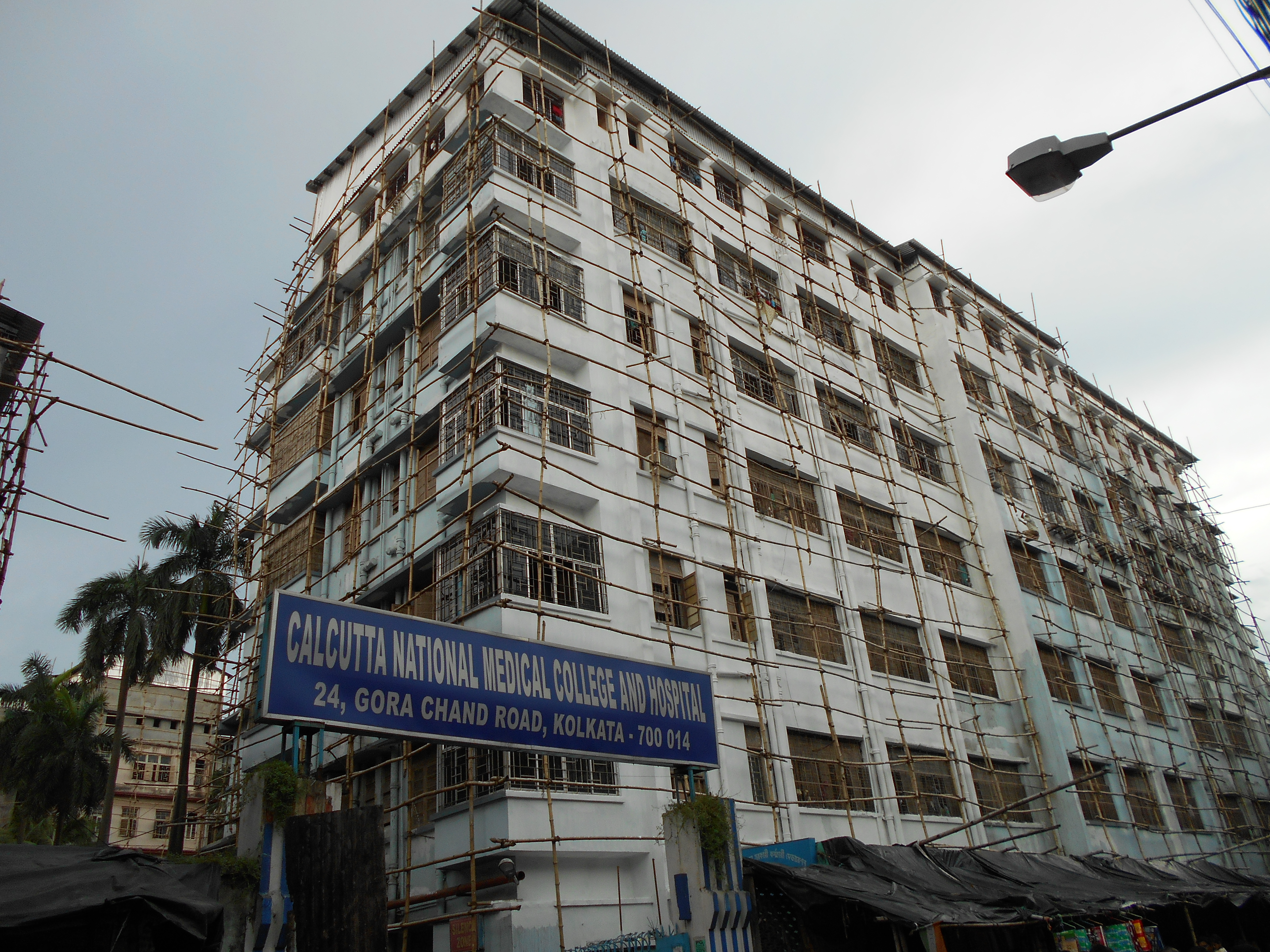
Calcutta National Medical College and Hospital Road-side View

== AGON – The annual cultural festival ==
AGON is the annual cultural festival of Calcutta National Medical College, organised by the CNMC Students' Union. AGON is reportedly the biggest medical college festival of Eastern India. Since its inception in 1980 Agon has been one of the most sought after college festivals among the medical student fraternity in West Bengal.

- Prefest – Agon Prefest is held for 4–7 days prior to the main fest. Prefest events include: Intercollege Sports Tournament (cricket, football, volleyball, badminton, table tennis, carrom and chess), Cinefest, Short-Film Festival, Solo and group creative events, CME (Continued medical education), Seminars, Dance workshop, Medical workshops, Blood donation camps, awareness campaigns etc.
- Fest – Following the traditions of the past four decades the main fest Agon is held for 4 days. It begins just after the prefest. Events include: Dance & Music contests, Battle of Band, Crime Scene Investigation, Treasure Hunt, Medi Quiz, General Quiz, Fandom Quizzes (Harry Potter, Game of Thrones, Friends, DC-Marvel), Stand-Up comedy, Drama competition, Street Play, X-Factor (Colors of Bengal), Paradox – The Fashion Show etc.

Among the major attractions of Agon are the 4 concert nights, which has regional artists, Bollywood celebrities, EDM concerts and DJ night. Agon has witnessed stellar performances from Amit Trivedi, Arijit Singh, Neha Kakkar, Sunidhi Chauhan, KK (singer), Mohit Chauhan, Mohammed Irfan (singer), Shalmali Kholgade, Shraddha Pandit, Fossils (band), Euphoria (Indian band), Javed Ali, Neeraj Shridhar, Rupankar, Anupam Roy, Sidhhu, Pota etc.

The cultural festival embraces the likes of many famous celebrities of the country, drawing about 5000 footfalls a day. With more than 40 inter college events and competitions spanning for more than a week, the fest is graced by more than 3000 college students, post graduate trainees, resident doctors, alumni of the college and faculty members. Students from more than 60 schools and colleges from Kolkata as well as from other parts of Eastern India take part in the competitions and attend the concerts. A number of social initiatives are undertaken by the Students' Union as part of the annual cultural festival AGON, which includes blood donation camps, thalassaemia screening camps, awareness campaigns etc.

AGON has an Android based mobile app named CNMCH AGON, which is the first time in India that a college event had their own app for event management and registration purposes. This app was made by the students of this medical institute.

== See also ==
- Calcutta Homoeopathic Medical College & Hospital
- Calcutta Unani Medical College and Hospital
- List of hospitals in India
