= Calcutta trilogy =

The Calcutta trilogy may refer to either of the following two Bengali film trilogies:

Three films by Satyajit Ray:

- Pratidwandi (The Adversary) (1970)
- Seemabaddha (Company Limited) (1971)
- Jana Aranya (The Middleman) (1976)

Three films by Mrinal Sen:

- Interview (1971)
- Calcutta 71 (1972)
- Padatik (The Guerilla Fighter) (1973)
