= National Institute of Homoeopathy =

Homoeopathy Institute in Salt Lake, West Bengal, India

National Institute of Homeopathy
- Motto: शरीरमाद्यं खलु धर्मसाधनम् (Sanskrit)
- Motto in English: Physical body is the medium for the righteous action
- Type: Homeopathy medical school
- Established: 10 December 1975 (50 years ago)
- Academic affiliations: WBUHS; NCH
- Budget: ₹93.96 crore (US$9.8 million) (2025–26)
- President: Union Minister of State for AYUSH
- Director: Pralay Sharma
- Students: Total Seats: BHMS - 126; MD(Hom) - 47; PhD(Hom) - 15
- Location: Salt Lake, Kolkata, West Bengal, India; 22°34′35″N 88°25′13″E
- Campus: Urban
- Website: nih.ayush.gov.in

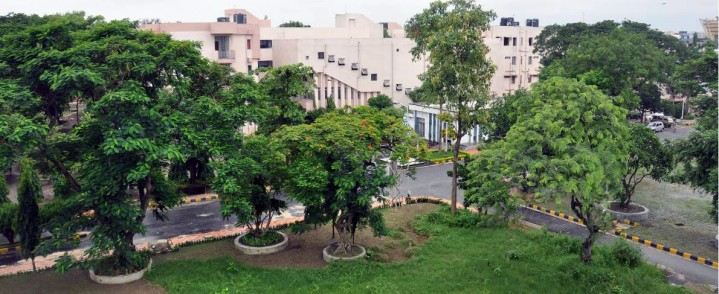
National Institute of Homoeopathy Building

National Institute of Homeopathy (NIH) is an autonomous organisation under the Ministry of Ayush, Government of India. It conducts the BHMS, MD (Homeopathy) and PhD (Homeopathy) courses in Homeopathy. The institute has a 250-bed hospital, with 10 for surgery and 10 for maternity cases. Consists of 25 halls for examination in total.

== History ==
National Institute of Homeopathy was established on 10 December 1975 as an autonomous organisation under the Ministry of Health and Family Welfare. It was located at Amherst Street, Kolkata and later shifted to the present location. It started awarding Bachelor of Homeopathic Medicine and Surgery (B.H.M.S.) degrees in 1987. In July 2023 Minister of AYUSH Sarbananda Sonowal announced that Institute to get additional 150 number of beds, previously institute has 100 number of beds would soon have 250 beds.

=== Hostel ===
The Union Ministry of Ayush inaugurated a new 400-bed undergraduate boys' hostel at the Institute in Kolkata. Union Minister Prataprao Jadhav led the ceremony, marking the institute's golden jubilee. Officials emphasized timely infrastructure expansion to support academic growth, while noting that NIH continues to provide accessible healthcare to approximately 3,000 patients daily through its outpatient departments.

== See also ==
- National Commission for Homoeopathy
- List of hospitals in India
