= Calcutta (band) =

American alternative rock band

- Origin: Camarillo, California
- Genres: Alternative rock
- Years active: 1995 - Present
- Labels: Independent
- Members: Prem Panicker; Sameer Sharma; Grant Umeda; Matthew Villa; Nathan Villa
- Past members: Jason Park
- Website: www.calcuttamusic.com

Calcutta is an alternative rock band formed in 1995, in Camarillo, California. Their musical influences include U2, Rush, Jimmy Eat World, and Smashing Pumpkins. From small beginnings as a garage band, Calcutta quickly set themselves apart by garnering a loyal following in Southern California. The band's success has been noted in local media outlets like the Ventura Country Star, California State University, Fullerton's Daily Titan, UCLA's Daily Bruin, University of California, Irvine's The New University, on radio stations like 95.1 KBBY, and also on websites like www.buzzcast.com, www.purevolume.com, and www.themusicedge.com.

== History ==
Calcutta was formed by highschool friends Prem Panicker, Grant Umeda (classically trained pianist and guitarist), Sameer Sharma (classically trained violinist and guitarist), and Jason Park in 1995. The original lineup for the band included Panicker on the drums, Umeda on the guitar and piano, Sharma on the guitar and bass, and Park singing the lead vocals. The band's love of rock music, and their classical training set them apart from the other garage bands in the area. As interest in the band increased, they released their first album in 1998, self-titled Calcutta. Following the release of their album, Calcutta received many requests to play at local venues such as the Ventura Theater, and Camarillo's Constitution Park.

Jason Park left the band in 1999 to follow a career in filmmaking. The remaining band-members teamed up with Mike Moshy and Nathan Villa to release their second album (Far Away) later that year, to a growing fanbase. After the release of their second album, the band received offers to play at Hollywood venues like The Roxy. During this time, the band's lineup changed to include Panicker on bass, Sharma and Umeda both on guitars, Nathan Villa on lead vocals, and Matthew Villa on drums.

After graduating from high school, Umeda and Sharma decided to pursue engineering degrees at UCLA, while Panicker decided to pursue a degree in political science at UCI. Nathan Villa went to CSUF to pursue a communications major. The band was able to balance their musical career with their college life, and went on to win the KROQ and University of California-sponsored UCLA Battle of the Bands, the UCLA Spring Sing, the Thousand Oaks Battle of the Bands, and the Moorpark College Battle of the Bands. Between recording sessions of their third release (... and I remain unchanged), Calcutta also performed with bands such as Sum 41 and Yellowcard. They also toured on the 2002 and 2003 Vans' Warped Tours.

In 2003, Calcutta recorded, engineered, and released their fourth and latest full-length album The World Alone. The album was a success and saw their fan base growing across the nation, following their inclusion as a featured artist on the ESPN NHL 2K5 game soundtrack for the Xbox and PlayStation 2, which included six songs from the album. Calcutta was a showcased artist at the Midwest Music Summit 2005 in Indianapolis and is playing show cases in Los Angeles and Hollywood, as well as performing throughout the country. Calcutta recorded an acoustic session for Sony/BMG in Santa Monica, California which was released in early 2007 on Sony Connect's website. Calcutta also finished writing and recording new material for their latest album, Out of Daylight, which has been released.

== Discography ==
Full-Lengths

- Far Away 1999
- The World Alone 2003
- Out of Daylight 2010

EPs:

- Calcutta 1998
- ...and I remain unchanged 2001
- Beyond Online Single 2002
