= RTS/CTS =

RTS/CTS (request to send/ clear to send) may refer to:

- Request to send and clear to send, flow control signals
  - RS-232 RTS/CTS, today's (EIA/TIA-232-F 1997) usual RS-232 hardware flow control
  - IEEE 802.11 RTS/CTS, wireless networking protocol flow control
