= Consider the Source =

American musical group

Consider The Source
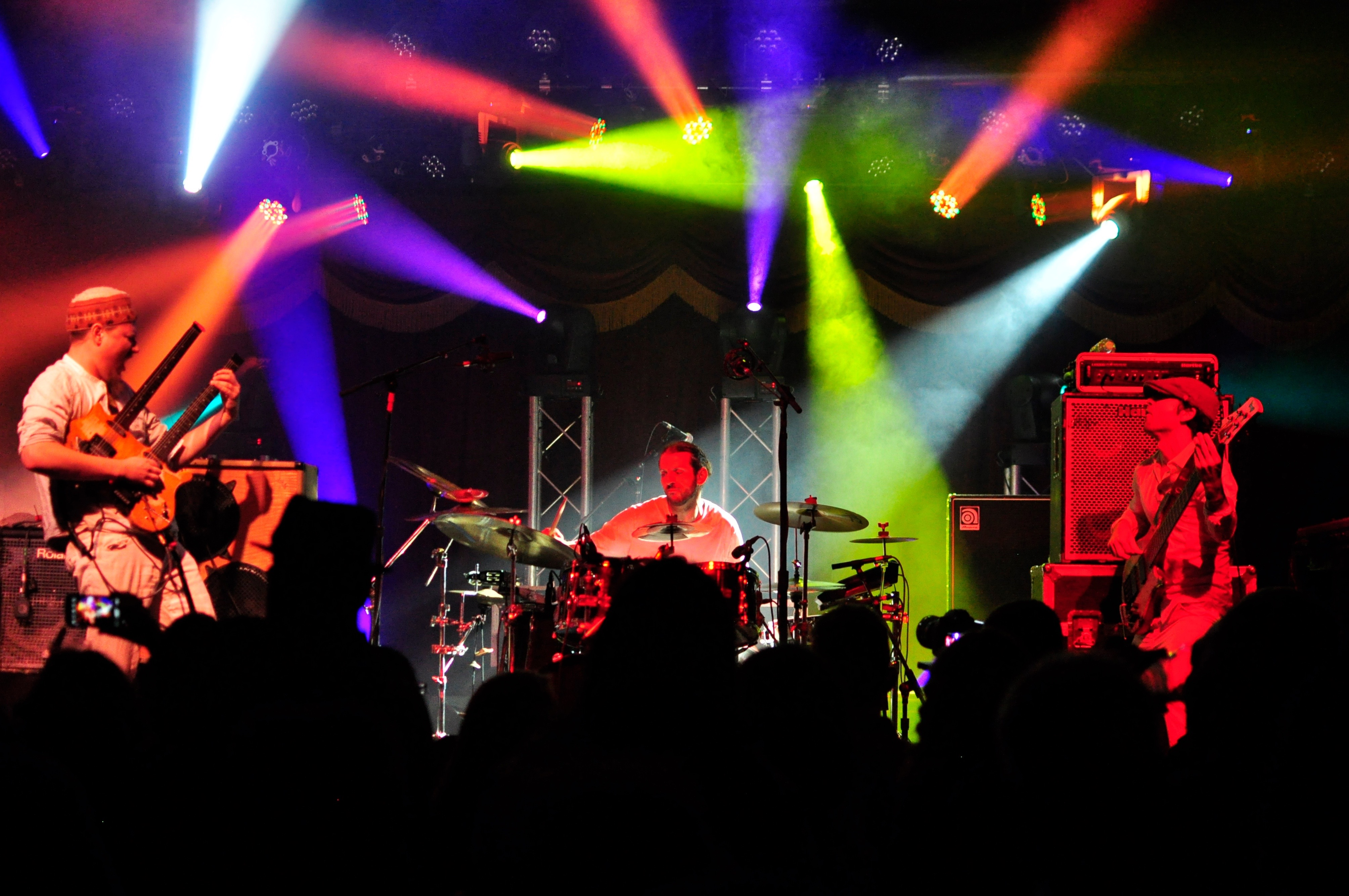
- Marin, left, Mann, center, and Ferrara, right, performing live in 2015

Background information
- Origin: New York City, New York
- Genres: Jazz metal, progressive metal
- Years active: 2004–present
- Labels: Independent
- Members: Gabriel Marin; John Ferrara; Jeff Mann
- Past members: Justin Ahiyon; Louis Miller
- Website: considerthesourcemusic.com

Consider the Source is an American instrumental trio from New York City. Formed in 2004, the group has released six studio albums, four live albums, and one compilation. They have toured extensively across the United States, Israel, Turkey, and Germany.

== History ==
Consider the Source started forming in 2004 after Gabriel Marin and Justin Ahiyon played together in a jam session and discovered their musical compatibility. John Ferrara and Ahiyon had been playing together since childhood. The three musicians met and their collaboration eventually turned into Consider the Source. The group started out almost exclusively improvisational and was not a full-time endeavor. They released a demo EP in 2005, and their debut album, Esperanto, was included on jazz critic Howard Mandel's list of his favorite albums from 2007. Around this time, the trio decided to put all of their efforts into the band. In the next two years, they toured the United States seven times and began to play festivals such as the 2008 NYC Fretless Guitar Festival.

In 2009, Consider the Source released their second full-length album, Are You Watching Closely and quickly followed with a third full-length album, That's What's Up, in 2010. In 2012, Ahiyon left the group, and was briefly replaced by Louis Miller, before Jeff Mann took over on the drum kit. The band toured Germany and Israel. The new trio continued to produce original material which was constantly being introduced at shows and resulted in two live albums. Around this time, the band also began to play full acoustic sets at summer festivals. In February 2014, Consider the Source completed a crowdfunding campaign to fund the production of their largest studio release, titled World War Trio. In October of the same year, part one was released as a stand-alone composition. In June 2015, parts two and three were released as a double disc.

== Musical style and influences ==
Guitarist Gabriel Marin plays a double-neck guitar customized with MIDI pickups and a fretless neck. He employs sweep picking and various synthesized instruments on his guitar which he controls with three pedalboards. Bassist John Ferrara plays a Fodera five-string bass and utilizes slap bass, slide, and tapping. On drums, Jeff Mann plays a range of styles from heavy double-bass to Indian tala rhythms.

Gabriel Marin and Justin Ahiyon traveled to India to study chaturangui and tabla respectively. Indian influence is evident in the alap sections that begin many of Consider the Source's compositions. Marin has stated, "Our music combines influences from Turkish, Bulgarian, North and South Indian styles with jazz and fusion, and then we filter it through our own heavy, rock and psychedelic sounds and approaches." The way the band divides odd meters into rhythms suitable for dance is inspired by Balkan music. Some of the group's major musical influences are Pachora, Paradox Trio, The Bad Plus, Mahavishnu Orchestra, King Crimson, and Tool. In 2010, they opened for another major influence, Victor Wooten. The group also mentions they draw inspiration from reading.

== Discography ==
Studio albums

- Consider the Source (2005) - demo EP
- Esperanto (2007)
- Are You Watching Closely (2009)
- That's What's Up (2010)
- World War Trio (2015)
- You Are Literally A Metaphor (2019)
- Hybrid Vol 1: Such as a Mule (2021)
- The Stare (2024)

Live albums

- Live at Pianos (2008)
- F*** It! We'll Do It Live – Volume 1 (2012)
- F*** It! We'll Do It Live – Volume 2 (2013)
- F*** It! We'll Do It Live – Volume 3 (2020)
- F**k It! We'll Do It Live - Volume 4: Hybrid Style (2022)

Compilations

- Past Is Prologue (2016)

== Band members ==
Current members

- Jeff Mann – drums, percussion, mandolin, acoustic guitar (2012–present)
- John Ferrara – bass, banjo bass, ubass, synth bass, slaperoo (2004–present)
- Gabriel Marin – Guitar, chaturangui, tanbur, saz, danbau, kamancheh, KAOSSPAD (2004–present)

Former members

- Louis Miller – drums, percussion (2012)
- Justin Ahiyon – drums, percussion (2004–2012)
