= Christian Television System =

South Korean broadcaster

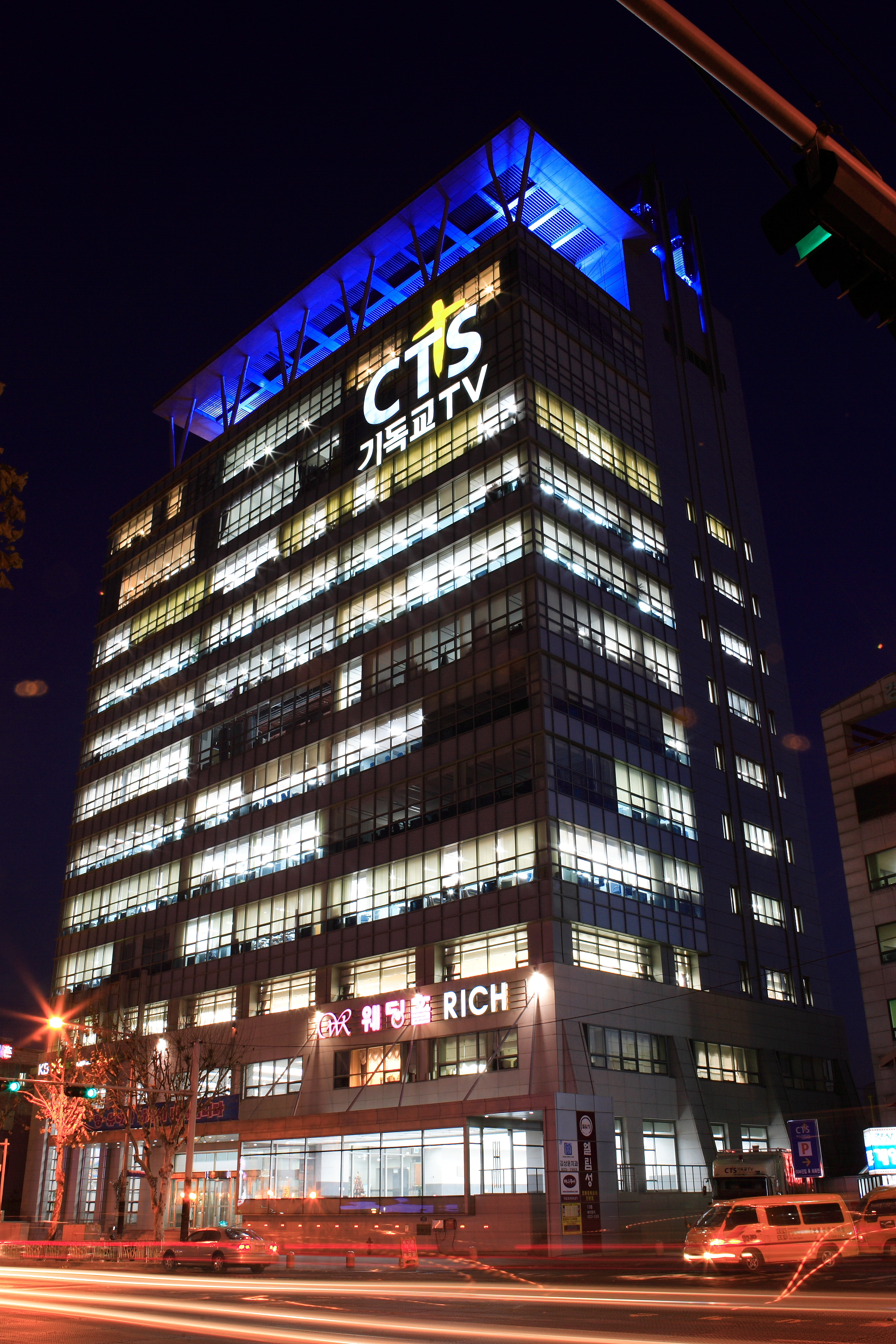
- Christian Television System in Daegu
- Type: Radio network (1995–present); Television network (2002–present)
- Country: South Korea
- Founded: December 1, 1995; 30 years ago
- Headquarters: Mokdong
- Broadcast area: South Korea, United States
- Official website: cts.tv

Christian Television System or CTS is a South Korean religious broadcasting system for Christians. The station has its own radio and TV.

== History ==
The station started on December 15, 1954, for the purpose of establishing a civil religious network.It was originally called KCTS (later changed to CTS)

The broadcasting system was affected by the Policy for Merger and Abolition of the Press.
