= MD (Homeopathy) =

Indian post-graduate homeopathic degree

PhD is the highest degree in homoeopathy. Awarded after a minimum of 3 years and a maximum of 8 years in 6 streams as of now in India. Most Homoeopaths who are academics are pursuing PhD. Regulated by the Ministry of AYUSH. Central Council of Homoeopathy was dissolved permanently and Ministry of AYUSH manages all streams of medicine in India except Allopathy.

MD (Homoeopathy) is the three-year post-graduate degree in homeopathy offered by many universities in India. The course is regulated by the Central Council of Homeopathy. There are 38 colleges in India offering both bachelors and post-graduate courses in homeopathy, and two exclusive PG colleges conducting MD courses in homeopathy. There are seven specializations offered in MD homeopathy course : Organon of Medicine with Homeopathic Philosophy, Homoeopathic Materia Medica, Repertory, Practice of Medicine, Homoeopathic Pharmacy, Pediatrics and Psychiatry. In order to get admission for the MD (Homeopathy) course, the candidate should have passed Bachelor of Homeopathic Medicine and Surgery.
