= Civic administration of Kolkata =

Civic administration in Kolkata, India

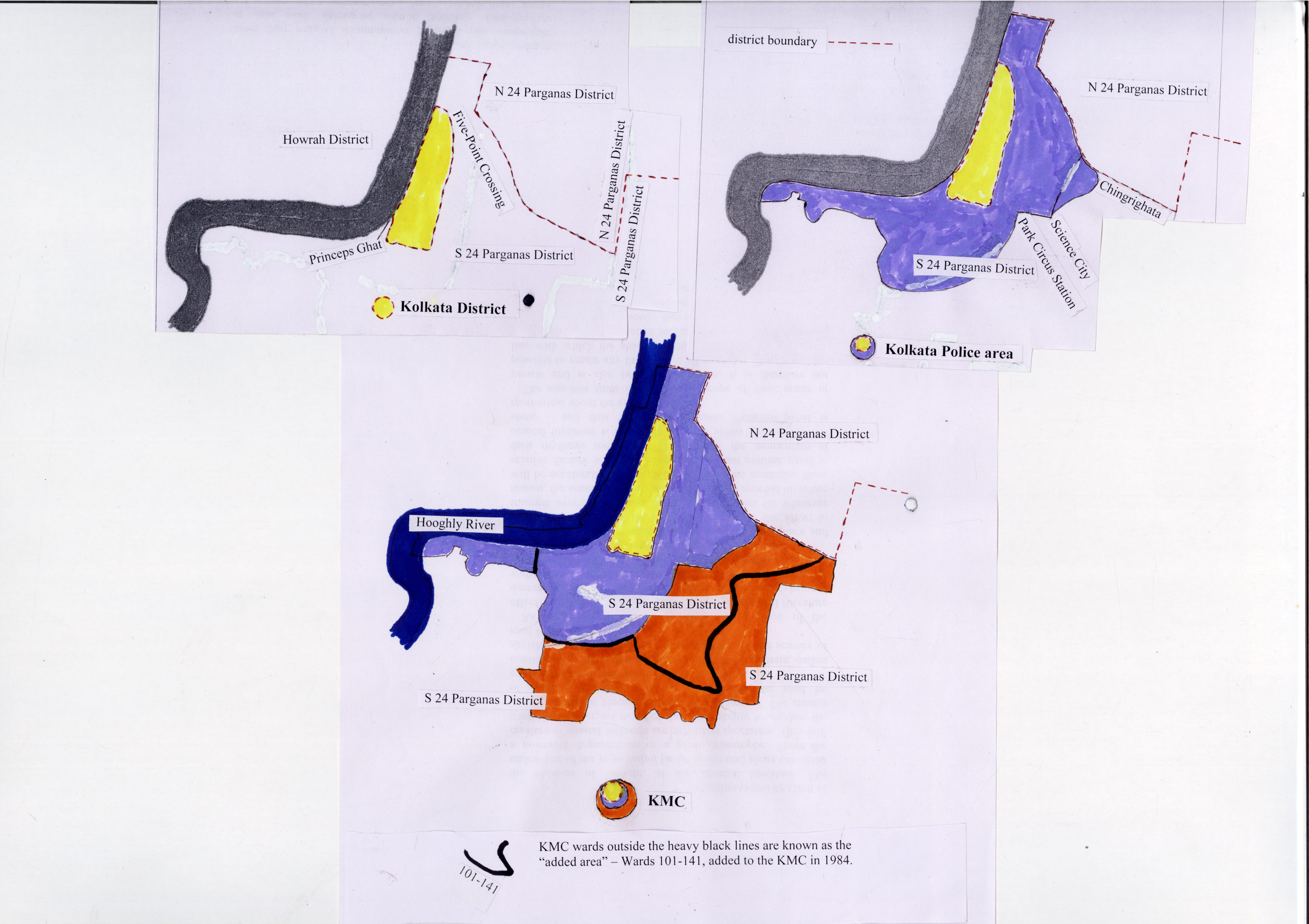
Jurisdictions of civic authorities, as of 2010

The civic administration of Kolkata (the metropolitan city and the capital of the West Bengal state of India) is executed by several government agencies, and consists of overlapping structural divisions. Kolkata's administrative agencies have areas of jurisdiction that do not coincide.

== Governing bodies ==
At least five administrative definitions of the city are available, many of which overlap each other. The entire KMC area comes under Kolkata district, with the setting up of the new Kolkata District Collector Office at Bhowanipore. This was done as a result of the State Government cabinet decision in 2012. Listed in ascending order of area, the broad administrative definitions of the city are :

=== Kolkata District ===
Headed by the District Collector for Kolkata district, it primarily includes the historic core and downtown parts of the city. It functions as an administrative unit for revenue, national and central policymaking and census enumeration purposes.

=== Kolkata Municipal Corporation (KMC) ===
Kolkata Municipal Corporation ward level map as of 2011 Census. Three additional wards have been added since then, taking the total to 144.

The total area of the city's main administrative body, the KMC, is the one most widely understood to be what constitutes ("Kolkata or Kolkata City"). Its 144 municipal wards span the entirety of the city's core area under the Kolkata District.

The KMC oversees and manages the civic infrastructure of the city's 16 boroughs which together encompass 144 wards. Each ward elects a councillor to the KMC. Each borough has a committee of councillors, each of whom is elected to represent a ward. By means of the borough committees, the corporation undertakes urban planning and maintains roads, government-aided schools, hospitals, and municipal markets. As Kolkata's apex body, the corporation discharges its functions through the mayor-in-council, which comprises a mayor, a deputy mayor, and ten other elected members of the KMC. The functions of the KMC include water supply, drainage and sewerage, sanitation, solid waste management, street lighting, and building regulation.

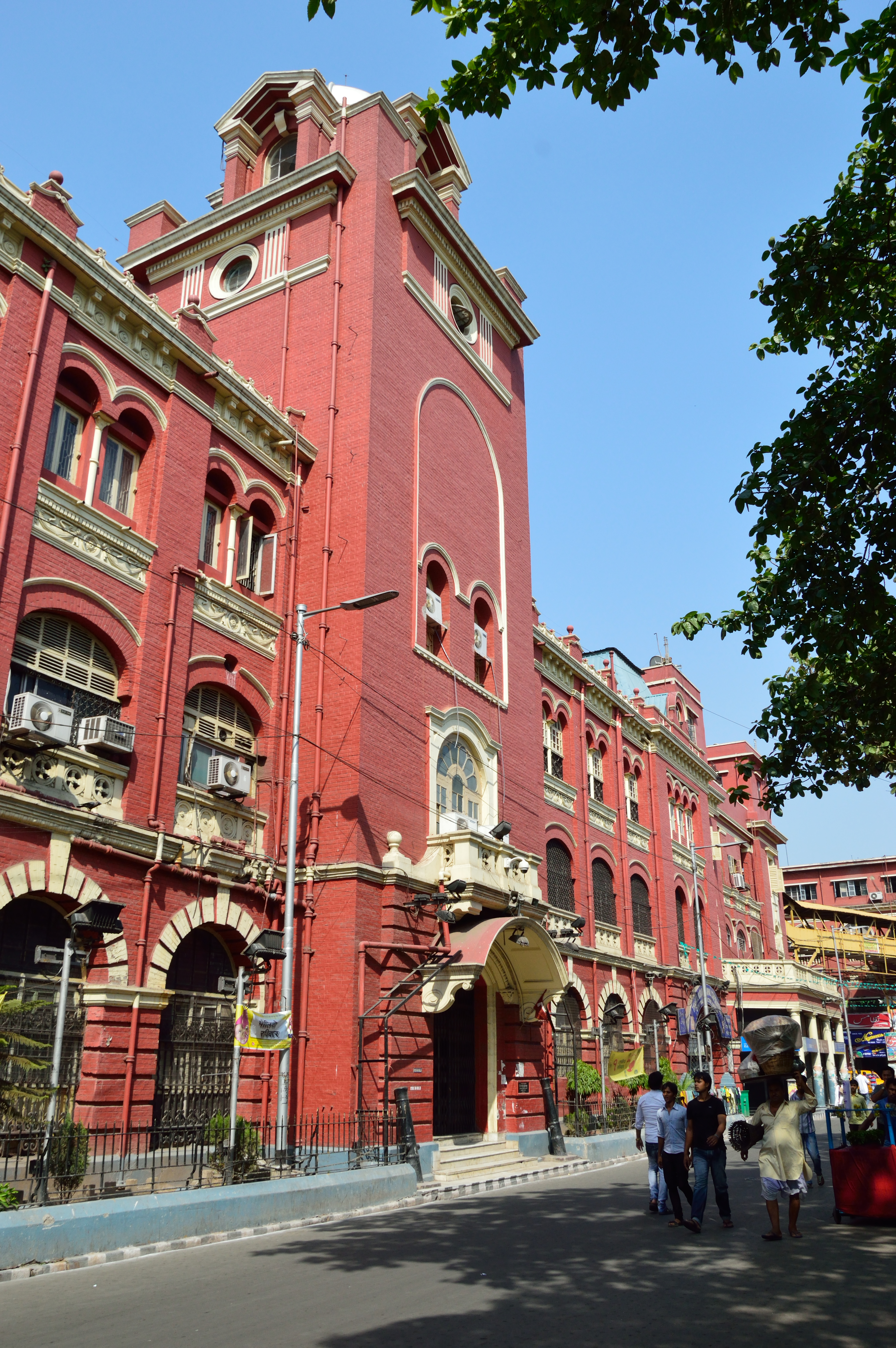
Kolkata Municipal Corporation

=== Kolkata Police ===
Since 2 September 2011, the area under the jurisdiction of Kolkata Police has remained co-terminus with the KMC area.

=== Greater Kolkata ===
A non-legal term with no fixed boundaries, it is used colloquially by citizens and enjoys wide recognition in conversations, advertisements and addresses, being firmly embedded in the city's social fabric. Historically, it has always broadly composed of the non-KMC area and other urban localities situated just adjacent to it. To the north, some of these localities are, from west to east: North Barrackpur, Barrackpore, Titagarh, Khardaha, Panihati, Kamarhati, Baranagar, New Barrackpore, Madhyamgram, Barasat, Dum Dum, North Dum Dum, South Dum Dum and Bidhannagar. To the south, these are from west to east: Maheshtala, Budge Budge, Pujali, Rajpur Sonarpur and Baruipur. Many of these have municipality status.

=== Kolkata Metropolitan Area ===
According to the 2011 Census of India, the much larger Kolkata Metropolitan Area is the third-largest urban agglomeration in India. It is spread across the districts of North 24 Parganas, South 24 Parganas, Nadia, Hooghly and Howrah, with nearly 2 crore residents. The Kolkata Metropolitan Development Authority (KMDA), another ancillary civic body, is responsible for the statutory planning and development of this mega urban area. The KMA includes a large suburban hinterland around the urban centres of Kolkata.

The city also has an apolitical titular post, that of the Sheriff of Kolkata. The Sheriff presides over various city-related functions and conferences.

== State government ==
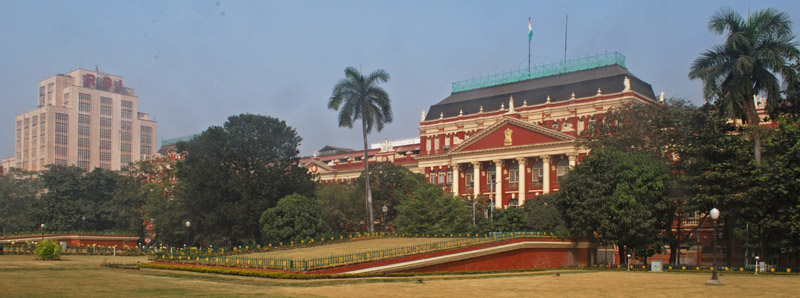
Historical State Secretariat Writers' Building

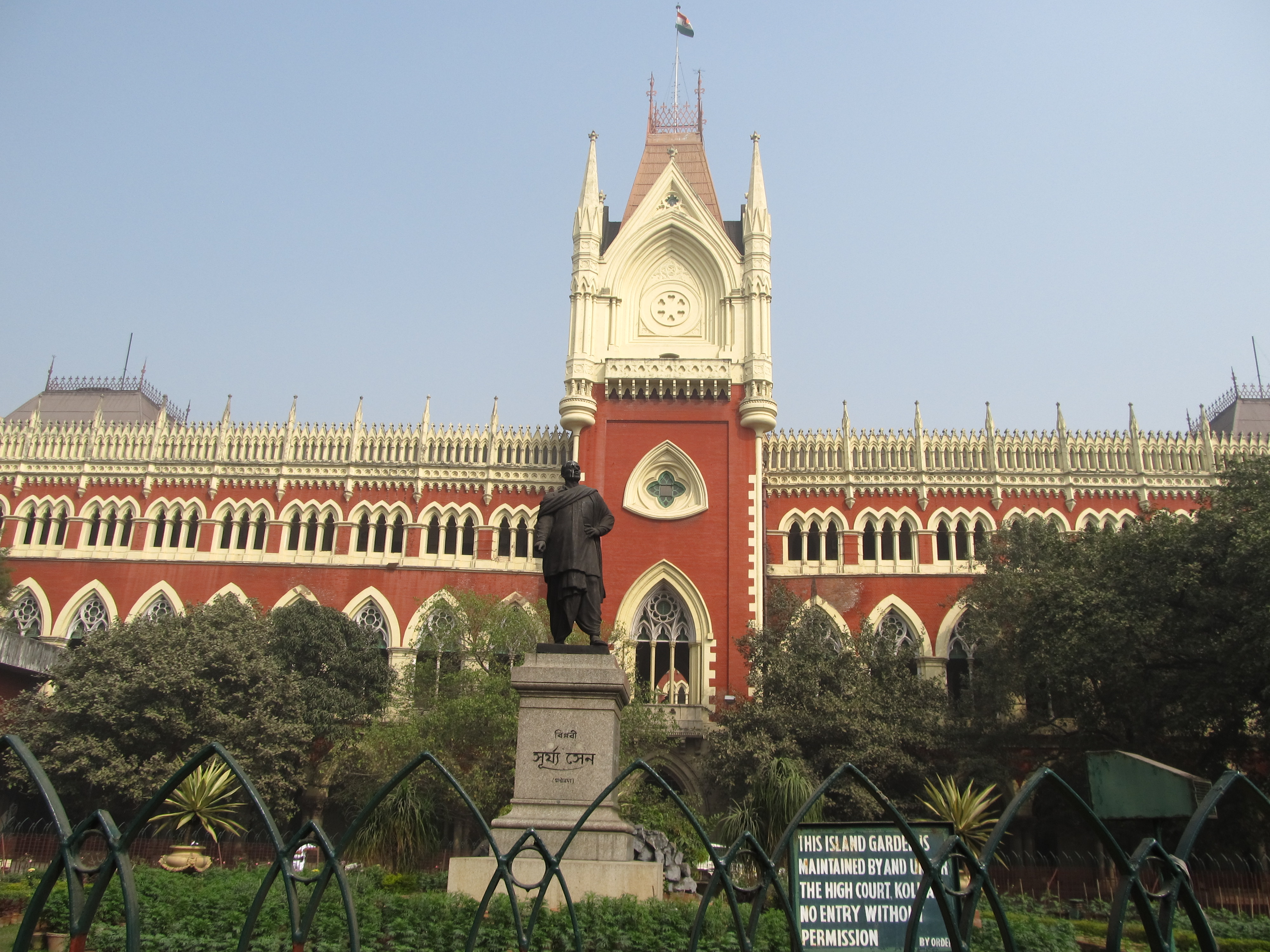
Calcutta High Court

As the capital of the state and the seat of the Government of West Bengal, Kolkata houses not only the various offices of local government listed above, but also, for the state level, the West Bengal Legislative Assembly, the Secretariat (Writers' Building) and the Calcutta High Court. Kolkata also has lower courts; the Small Causes Court for civil matters, and the Sessions Court for criminal cases.

== Assembly and parliamentary constituencies ==
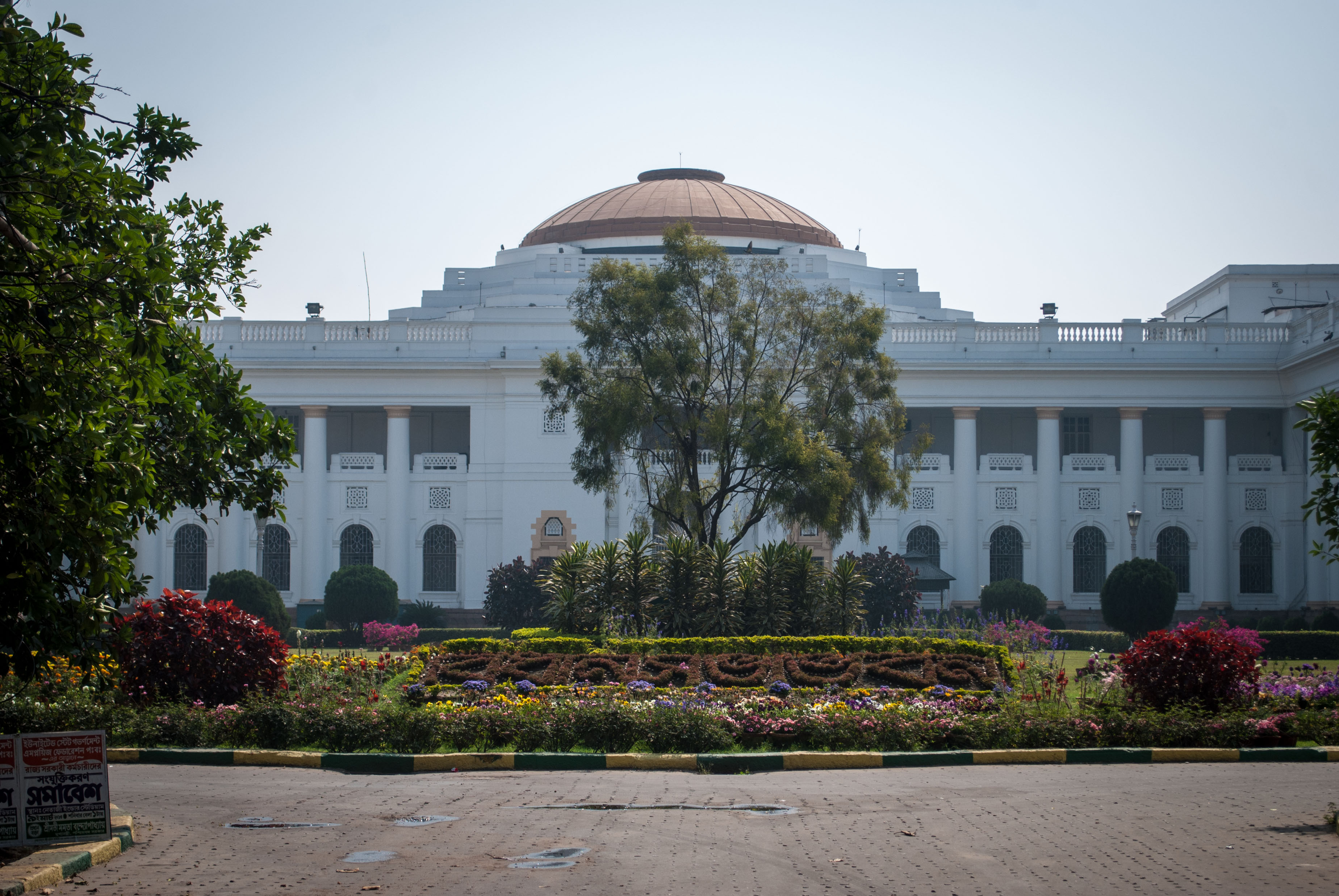
West Bengal Legislative Assembly Bidhan Sabha

Loksabha map that falls under KMC

The parliamentary constituencies and assembly constituencies in West Bengal, as defined by Election Commission of India, underwent delimitation in 2008 according to the report of the Delimitation Commission. Kolkata district is divided into 16 assembly constituencies (and partially 1 more also) — Kashipur-Belgachhia, Maniktala, Shyampukur, Jorasanko, Beleghata, Entally, Chowringhee, Kolkata Port, Metiaburuz (partially), Bhabanipur, Ballygunge, Rashbehari, Kasba, Behala Purba, Behala Paschim, Tollyganj and Jadavpur. There are two parliamentary constituencies — Kolkata North and Kolkata South — that have the name "Kolkata" associated with them. Chowringhee, Entally, Beliaghata, Jorasanko, Shyampukur, Maniktala and Kashipur-Belgachhia assembly constituencies form Kolkata Uttar (Lok Sabha constituency). Kolkata Port, Bhabanipur, Ballygunge, Rashbehari, Kasba, Behala Purba and Behala Paschim assembly constituencies form Kolkata Dakshin (Lok Sabha constituency).

Jadavpur and Tollyganj assembly constituencies are within Jadavpur parliamentary constituency. Few wards (Ward no 136 to 141) of Kolkata Municipal Corporation (Kolkata district) area constitute part of Metiaburuz (Vidhan Sabha constituency). Metiaburuz assembly constituency also has wards from Maheshtala Municipality of South 24 Parganas District. Metiaburuz assembly constituency lies within Diamond Harbour parliamentary constituency.
