= Calcutta Technical School =

Technical institute in West Bengal, India

The Calcutta Technical School
- Type: Polytechnic college
- Established: 1926; 100 years ago
- Affiliations: West Bengal State Council of Technical and Vocational Education and Skill Development
- Location: Kolkata, West Bengal, India
- Campus: Urban
- Approvals: AICTE
- Website: https://polytechnic.wbtetsd.gov.in/ctskolkata

The Calcutta Technical School (CTS) is a technical institute is located in the city of Kolkata, West Bengal of India. It is affiliated to the West Bengal State Council of Technical and Vocational Education and Skill Development (WBSCT & VE & ESD), approved by All India Council For Technical Education (AICTE) and provides Diploma level technical education in Electrical, Mechanical, Computer Science and Civil Engineering.

== History ==
Calcutta was the center of activity of British India during the 18th Century. After industrial revolution it was seeking its industrial expansion in its vast empire. The immense industrial potentiality of Bengal attracted the attention of entrepreneurs. As a result of a number of industries grew up in and around Calcutta. The requirement of the engineers of these industries were largely met by a few engineering colleges then existed. The problem engaged the attention of the Govt. of Bengal and The Calcutta Technical Institute Committee was appointed in 1912 to advise the Govt. on the question of creating a technical institute in Calcutta. The two institutes viz. Calcutta Technical Night School, Bowbazar and Bengal Technical Institute, Upper Circular Road were agreed to be absorbed by the proposed technical institute. Erection of the building on the land acquired by the Govt. of Bengal at a nominal rent of Rs. 1/annum was started in 1922 at an estimated expenditure of Rs. 8.5 lakh. Before the final opening of the school on 1 February 1926, the Governing Body appointed its first Principal Mr. E.G. Hogben from the U.K. The school was offered before converted into a full-fledged polytechnic in 1988, the following courses of studies:

- 1. Diploma Course in Electrical and Mechanical Engineering (4 years) of Board of Apprentice Training
- 2. Part-time Diploma Course in Civil Engineering of the state council for technical education, West Bengal
- 3. Shipwright Course
- 4. Electric Supervisors' Course
- 5. Coaching classes for A.M.I.E. examination
- 6. Related instruction classes for Trade Apprentices under the Apprentice Act 1961

== Departments ==
CTS provides diploma level education in Mechanical Engineering, Computer Science and Technology, Civil Engineering and Electrical Engineering.

Department	Intake Capacity
Electrical Engineering	60+Voclet
Mechanical Engineering	60+Voclet
Computer Science and Technology	60+Voclet
Civil Engineering	60+Voclet
