= Calcutta Homoeopathic Medical College & Hospital =

Homeopathic medical college and hospital in India

- Type: Public Homeopathy Medical College & Hospital
- Established: 1881; 144 years ago
- Academic affiliations: WBUHS, NCH
- Principal: Rajat Chattopadhyay
- Students: Total: BHMS – 63; MD – 20
- Location: 265, 266, Acharya Prafulla Chandra Road, Yogi Para, Garpar, Machuabazar, Kolkata, West Bengal 700009, West Bengal, India; 22.5821517°N 88.3740378°E
- Website: www.chmch.in

The Calcutta Homoeopathic Medical College & Hospital(CHMCH), established in 1881, is a homoeopathic medical college and hospital in Kolkata, West Bengal, India. It is the oldest homoeopathic medical college in India. It offers the Bachelor of Homeopathic Medicine and Surgery (BHMS) and MD (Homoeopathy) courses. This college is recognized by the National Commission for Homoeopathy (CCH), Ministry of Ayush and affiliated with the West Bengal University of Health Sciences.

== See also ==
- List of hospitals in India
