= Calcutta Unani Medical College and Hospital =

Medical college in West Bengal, India

- Type: Private Unani Medical College & Hospital
- Established: 1994; 32 years ago
- Affiliations: WBUHS
- Location: 8/1, Abdul Halim Lane, Maula Ali, Taltala, Kolkata, West Bengal 700016, India; 22°33′25.73″N 88°21′35.30″E
- Website: www.calumch.org

Calcutta Unani Medical College and Hospital is an Unani medical college in Kolkata, West Bengal, India. It was established in 1994 and is the only government-recognized Unani medical college in West Bengal. This college is affiliated with the West Bengal University of Health Sciences. This college is recognized by the Ministry of Ayush, Government of India. It offers a BUMS degree course.
