= National Commission for Homoeopathy =

Statutory body of the Government of India

- Abbreviation: NCH
- Formation: 1973; 53 years ago, as Central Council of Homoeopathy; 2021; 5 years ago, as National Commission for Homoeopathy
- Location(s): JanakPuri; New Delhi – 1100 58
- Region served: India
- Chairperson: Dr. Pinakin N. Trivedi
- Parent organisation: Ministry of AYUSH
- Website: nch.org.in

The National Commission for Homoeopathy (formerly known as Central Council of Homoeopathy) is a statutory body under the Ministry of AYUSH, Government of India. Central Council of Homoeopathy was set up by the Government of India in 1973. The National Commission for Homoeopathy was constituted on 5 July 2021 and on the same date, the Homoeopathy Central Council Act, 1973 was repealed and the Central Council of Homoeopathy was superseded. It is one of the Professional Councils of University Grants Commission (UGC), formed to monitor higher education in India. Any institution desiring to grant a qualification in homeopathy is required to apply to the Council, which prescribes course curriculum and maintains central registers of homeopaths.

== History ==
The institution set up under the Central Council of Homeopathy Act 1973, (Act 59). Any university or similar institution in India offering either a degree or a diploma in homeopathy can do so only if it is approved by CCH, apart from being listed under the schedules of the above-mentioned act. The CCH also defines particular course curriculum and notifies benchmarks that need to be maintained by homeopathy teaching institutions, apart from maintaining a central registry of all homeopathy physicians in India.

In 2007, the Union Health Ministry set up the 'National Council for Clinical Establishments' for "determine minimum standards" for clinical establishments. A CCH representative is also a formal member of this National Council.

In October 2016, the Central Bureau of Investigation (CBI) arrested the CCH's chief, Ramjee Singh and another man in relation to the alleged collection of money to provide a favorable report that would allow regulatory approval.

== Bachelor of Homeopathic Medicine and Surgery ==
The council regulates the Bachelor of Homeopathic Medicine and Surgery (B.H.M.S.). It is a graduate degree awarded after five and a half years' study, including one-year internship.

== MD (Homeopathy) in India ==
There is also a post-graduate degree awarded after three years' study upon completion of which an MD (Homeopathy) post-graduate degree is awarded.
