= Che (surname) =

Che (车/車)
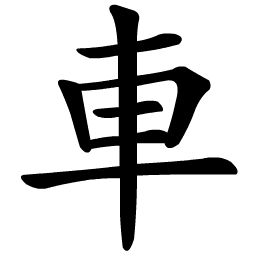
- Pronunciation: Chē (Mandarin); Ku (Hokkien)
- Language: Chinese

Origin
- Language: Old Chinese
- Meaning: Chariot, wagon

Other names
- Derivative: Cha (Korean)

Che is the Mandarin pinyin romanization of the Chinese surname written 車 in traditional Chinese and 车 in simplified Chinese. It is listed 229th in the Song dynasty classic text Hundred Family Surnames. As of 2008, it is the 191st most common surname in China, shared by 540,000 people. It is romanized Cha in Korean.

== Notable people ==
- Catherine Che (1952–2021), Hong Kong ten-pin bowling player
- Che Chew Chan (born 1982), Malaysian taekwondo practitioner
- Che Chi Man (born 1975), Macanese footballer
- Che Chi-ming (born 1957), Hong Kong chemist
- Che Dingjin (車鼎晉; 1668–1733), Qing dynasty scholar and poet, son of Che Wanyu
- Che Feng (born 1970), Chinese business mogul
- Genaro Che (died 1998), Belizean soldier
- Che Hongcai (born 1936), Chinese linguist
- Che Jun (born 1955), Chinese politician and Governor of Zhejiang province
- Che Mah (1838–1926), Chinese dwarf
- Che Mian (born 1983), Chinese Paralympic athlete
- Che Qingyun (車慶雲; 1881–?), Republic of China general
- Che Runqiu (born 1990), football player
- Che Shiwei (born 1996), Chinese footballer
- Stephanie Che (born 1974), Hong Kong singer and actress
- Wenquan Che (Chinese: 車文荃), Chinese microwave engineer, professor, and deputy in the National People's Congress
- Che Xiangchen (车向忱; 1898–1971), Vice-Governor of Liaoning province
- Che Xiaoxi (born 1993), Chinese table tennis player
- Che Yanjiang (車炎江; born 1969), Taiwanese singer
- Che Yin (車胤; 4th century), Eastern Jin dynasty official
- Che Yonghong (車永宏; 1833–1914), martial artist, xingyiquan master
- Che Yongli (born 1980), actress
- Che Wanyu (車萬育; 1632–1705), Qing dynasty scholar-official
- Che Zhihong (born 1975), Chinese handball player
- Che Zhou (車冑; died 199 AD), Eastern Han dynasty general under Cao Cao
