= Marine engineering =

Engineering and design of shipboard systems

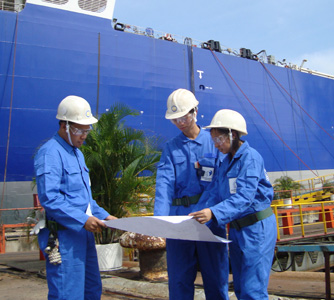
Marine engineers reviewing ship plans

Marine engineering is the engineering of watercraft, ocean systems, and ocean structures. After completing this degree, one can join a ship as an officer in the engine department and eventually rise to the rank of chief engineer. This rank is one of the top ranks onboard and is equal to the rank of a ship's captain. Marine engineering is the highly preferred course to join the merchant Navy as an officer, as it provides ample opportunities in terms of both afloat and ashore jobs.

Marine engineering applies a number of engineering sciences, including mechanical engineering, electrical engineering, electronic engineering, and computer Engineering, to the development, design, operation and maintenance of watercraft propulsion and ocean systems. It includes but is not limited to power and propulsion plants, machinery, piping, automation and control systems for marine vehicles of any kind, as well as coastal and offshore structures.

== History ==
Archimedes is traditionally regarded as the first marine engineer, having developed a number of marine engineering systems in antiquity. Modern marine engineering dates back to the beginning of the Industrial Revolution (early 1700s).

In 1807, Robert Fulton successfully used a steam engine to propel a vessel through the water. Fulton's ship used the engine to power a small wooden paddle wheel as its marine propulsion system. The integration of a steam engine into a watercraft to create a marine steam engine was the start of the marine engineering profession. Only twelve years after Fulton's Clermont had her first voyage, the Savannah marked the first sea voyage from America to Europe. Around 50 years later the steam powered paddle wheels had a peak with the creation of the Great Eastern, which was as big as one of the cargo ships of today, 700 feet in length, weighing 22,000 tons. Paddle steamers would become the front runners of the steamship industry for the next thirty years till the next type of propulsion came around.

== Training ==
There are several educational paths to becoming a marine engineer, all of which includes earning a university or college degree, such as a Bachelor of Engineering (B.Eng. or B.E.), Bachelor of Science (B.Sc. or B.S.), Bachelor of Technology (B.Tech.), Bachelor of Technology Management and Marine Engineering (B.TecMan & MarEng), or a Bachelor of Applied Science (B.A.Sc.) in Marine Engineering.

Depending on the country and jurisdiction, to be licensed as a Marine engineer, a Master's degree, such as a Master of Engineering (M.Eng.), Master of Science (M.Sc. or M.S.), or Master of Applied Science (M.A.Sc.) may be required.

Some marine engineers join the profession laterally, entering from other disciplines, like Mechanical Engineering, Civil Engineering, Electrical Engineering, Geomatics Engineering and Environmental Engineering, or from science-based fields, such as Geology, Geophysics, Physics, Geomatics, Earth Science, and Mathematics. To qualify as a marine engineer, those changing professions are required to earn a graduate Marine Engineering degree, such as an M.Eng, M.S., M.Sc., or M.A.Sc., after graduating from a different quantitative undergraduate program.

The fundamental subjects of marine engineering study usually include:

- Mathematics; Calculus, Algebra, Differential Equations, Numerical Analysis
- Geoscience; Geochemistry, Geophysics, Mineralogy, Geomatics
- Mechanics; Rock mechanics, Soil Mechanics, Geomechanics
- Thermodynamics; Heat Transfer, Work (thermodynamics), Mass Transfer
- Hydrogeology
- Fluid Mechanics; Fluid statics, Fluid Dynamics
- Geostatistics; Spatial Analysis, Statistics
- Control Engineering; Control Theory, Instrumentation
- Surface Mining; Open-pit mining

== Related Fields ==
=== Naval architecture ===
In the engineering of seagoing vessels, naval architecture is concerned with the overall design of the ship and its propulsion through the water, while marine engineering ensures that the ship systems function as per the design. Although they have distinctive disciplines, naval architects and marine engineers often work side-by-side.

=== Ocean engineering (and combination with Marine engineering) ===
Ocean engineering is concerned with other structures and systems in or adjacent to the ocean, including offshore platforms, coastal structures such as piers and harbors, and other ocean systems such as ocean wave energy conversion and underwater life-support systems. This in fact makes ocean engineering a distinctive field from marine engineering, which is concerned with the design and application of shipboard systems specifically. However, on account of its similar nomenclature and multiple overlapping core disciplines (e.g. hydrodynamics, hydromechanics, and materials science), "ocean engineering" sometimes operates under the umbrella term of "marine engineering", especially in industry and academia outside of the U.S. The same combination has been applied to the rest of this article.

=== Oceanography ===
Oceanography is a scientific field concerned with the acquisition and analysis of data to characterize the ocean. Although separate disciplines, marine engineering and oceanography are closely intertwined: marine engineers often use data gathered by oceanographers to inform their design and research, and oceanographers use tools designed by marine engineers (more specifically, oceanographic engineers) to advance their understanding and exploration of the ocean.

=== Mechanical engineering ===
Marine engineering incorporates many aspects of mechanical engineering. One manifestation of this relationship lies in the design of shipboard propulsion systems. Mechanical engineers design the main propulsion plant, the powering and mechanization aspects of the ship functions such as steering, anchoring, cargo handling, heating, ventilation, air conditioning interior and exterior communication, and other related requirements. Electrical power generation and electrical power distribution systems are typically designed by their suppliers; the only design responsibility of the marine engineering is installation.

Furthermore, an understanding of mechanical engineering topics such as fluid dynamics, fluid mechanics, linear wave theory, strength of materials, structural mechanics, and structural dynamics is essential to a marine engineer's repertoire of skills. These and other mechanical engineering subjects serve as an integral component of the marine engineering curriculum.

=== Civil Engineering ===
Civil engineering concepts play in an important role in many marine engineering projects such as the design and construction of ocean structures, ocean bridges and tunnels, and port/harbor design.

=== Electronics and Robotics ===
Marine engineering often deals in the fields of electrical engineering and robotics, especially in applications related to employing deep-sea cables and UUVs.

==== Deep-sea cables ====
A series of transoceanic fiber optic cables are responsible for connecting much of the world's communication via the internet, carrying as much as 99 percent of total global internet and signal traffic. These cables must be engineered to withstand deep-sea environments that are remote and often unforgiving, with extreme pressures and temperatures as well as potential interference by fishing, trawling, and sea life.

==== UUV autonomy and networks ====
The use of unmanned underwater vehicles (UUVs) stands to benefit from the use of autonomous algorithms and networking. Marine engineers aim to learn how advancements in autonomy and networking can be used to enhance existing UUV technologies and facilitate the development of more capable underwater vehicles.

=== Petroleum Engineering ===
A knowledge of marine engineering proves useful in the field of petroleum engineering, as hydrodynamics and seabed integration serve as key elements in the design and maintenance of offshore oil platforms.

=== Marine construction ===
Marine construction is the process of building structures in or adjacent to large bodies of water, usually the sea. These structures can be built for a variety of purposes, including transportation, energy production, and recreation. Marine construction can involve the use of a variety of building materials, predominantly steel and concrete. Some examples of marine structures include ships, offshore platforms, moorings, pipelines, cables, wharves, bridges, tunnels, breakwaters and docks.

== Challenges specific to marine engineering ==
=== Hydrodynamic loading ===
In the same way that civil engineers design to accommodate wind loads on building and bridges, marine engineers design to accommodate a ship or submarine struck by waves millions of times over the course of the vessel's life. These load conditions are also found in marine construction and coastal engineering

=== Stability ===
Any seagoing vessel has the constant need for hydrostatic stability. A naval architect, like an airplane designer, is concerned with stability. What makes the naval architect's job unique is that a ship operates in two fluids simultaneously: water and air. Even after a ship has been designed and put to sea, marine engineers face the challenge of balancing cargo, as stacking containers vertically increases the mass of the ship and shifts the center of gravity higher. The weight of fuel also presents a problem, as the pitch of the ship may cause the liquid to shift, resulting in an imbalance. In some vessels, this offset will be counteracted by storing water inside larger ballast tanks. Marine engineers are responsible for the task of balancing and tracking the fuel and ballast water of a ship. Floating offshore structures have similar constraints.

=== Corrosion ===
The saltwater environment faced by seagoing vessels makes them highly susceptible to corrosion. In every project, marine engineers are concerned with surface protection and preventing galvanic corrosion. Corrosion can be inhibited through cathodic protection by introducing pieces of metal (e.g. zinc) to serve as a "sacrificial anode" in the corrosion reaction. This causes the metal to corrode instead of the ship's hull. Another way to prevent corrosion is by sending a controlled amount of low DC current through the ship's hull, thereby changing the hull's electrical charge and delaying the onset of electro-chemical corrosion. Similar problems are encountered in coastal and offshore structures.

=== Anti-fouling ===
Anti-fouling is the process of eliminating obstructive organisms from essential components of seawater systems. Depending on the nature and location of marine growth, this process is performed in a number of different ways:

- Marine organisms may grow and attach to the surfaces of the outboard suction inlets used to obtain water for cooling systems. Electro-chlorination involves running high electrical current through sea water, altering the water's chemical composition to create sodium hypochlorite, purging any bio-matter.
- An electrolytic method of anti-fouling involves running electrical current through two anodes (Scardino, 2009). These anodes typically consist of copper and aluminum (or alternatively, iron). The first metal, copper anode, releases its ion into the water, creating an environment that is too toxic for bio-matter. The second metal, aluminum, coats the inside of the pipes to prevent corrosion.
- Other forms of marine growth such as mussels and algae may attach themselves to the bottom of a ship's hull. This growth interferes with the smoothness and uniformity of the ship's hull, causing the ship to have a less hydrodynamic shape that causes it to be slower and less fuel-efficient. Marine growth on the hull can be remedied by using special paint that prevents the growth of such organisms.

=== Pollution control ===
==== Sulfur emission ====
The burning of marine fuels releases harmful pollutants into the atmosphere. Ships burn marine diesel in addition to heavy fuel oil. Heavy fuel oil, being the heaviest of refined oils, releases sulfur dioxide when burned. Sulfur dioxide emissions have the potential to raise atmospheric and ocean acidity causing harm to marine life. However, heavy fuel oil may only be burned in international waters due to the pollution created. It is commercially advantageous due to the cost effectiveness compared to other marine fuels. It is prospected that heavy fuel oil will be phased out of commercial use by the year 2020 (Smith, 2018).

==== Oil and water discharge ====
Water, oil, and other substances collect at the bottom of the ship in what is known as the bilge. Bilge water is pumped overboard, but must pass a pollution threshold test of 15 ppm (parts per million) of oil to be discharged. Water is tested and either discharged if clean or recirculated to a holding tank to be separated before being tested again. The tank it is sent back to, the oily water separator, utilizes gravity to separate the fluids due to their viscosity. Ships over 400 gross tons are required to carry the equipment to separate oil from bilge water. Further, as enforced by MARPOL, all ships over 400 gross tons and all oil tankers over 150 gross tons are required to log all oil transfers in an oil record book.

=== Cavitation ===
Cavitation is the process of forming an air bubble in a liquid due to the vaporization of that liquid cause by an area of low pressure. This area of low pressure lowers the boiling point of a liquid allowing it to vaporize into a gas. Cavitation can take place in pumps, which can cause damage to the impeller that moves the fluids through the system. Cavitation is also seen in propulsion. Low pressure pockets form on the surface of the propeller blades as its revolutions per minute increase. Cavitation on the propeller causes a small but violent implosion which could warp the propeller blade. To remedy the issue, more blades allow the same amount of propulsion force but at a lower rate of revolutions. This is crucial for submarines as the propeller needs to keep the vessel relatively quiet to stay hidden. With more propeller blades, the vessel is able to achieve the same amount of propulsion force at lower shaft revolutions.

=== Wave loading ===
Wave loading on the steel jacket structure of a Production Utilities Quarters Compression (PUQC) platform in the Rong Doi oil field, offshore Vietnam (see Oil megaprojects (2010)).

Wave loading is most commonly the application of a pulsed or wavelike load to a material or object. This is most commonly used in the analysis of piping, ships, or building structures which experience wind, water, or seismic disturbances.

==== Examples of wave loading ====
- Offshore storms and pipes: As large waves pass over shallowly buried pipes, water pressure increases above it. As the trough approaches, pressure over the pipe drops and this sudden and repeated variation in pressure can break pipes. The difference in pressure for a wave with wave height of about 10 m would be equivalent to one atmosphere (101.3 kPa or 14.7 psi) pressure variation between crest and trough and repeated fluctuations over pipes in relatively shallow environments could set up resonance vibrations within pipes or structures and cause problems.
- Engineering oil platforms: The effects of wave-loading are a serious issue for engineers designing oil platforms, which must contend with the effects of wave loading, and have devised a number of algorithms to do so.

== Applications ==
The following categories provide a number of focus areas in which marine engineers direct their efforts.

=== Arctic Engineering ===
In designing systems that operate in the arctic (especially scientific equipment such as meteorological instrumentation and oceanographic buoys), marine engineers must overcome an array of design challenges. Equipment must be able to operate at extreme temperatures for prolonged periods of time, often with little to no maintenance. This creates the need for exceptionally temperature-resistant materials and durable precision electronic components.

=== Coastal Design and Restoration ===
Coastal engineering applies a mixture of civil engineering and other disciplines to create coastal solutions for areas along or near the ocean. In protecting coastlines from wave forces, erosion, and sea level rise, marine engineers must consider whether they will use a "gray" infrastructure solution - such as a breakwater, culvert, or sea wall made from rocks and concrete - or a "green" infrastructure solution that incorporates aquatic plants, mangroves, and/or marsh ecosystems. It has been found that gray infrastructure costs more to build and maintain, but it may provide better protection against ocean forces in high-energy wave environments. A green solution is generally less expensive and more well-integrated with local vegetation, but may be susceptible to erosion or damage if executed improperly. In many cases engineers will select a hybrid approach that combines elements of both gray and green solutions.

=== Deep Sea Systems ===
==== Life Support ====
The design of underwater life-support systems such as underwater habitats presents a set of challenges requiring a detailed knowledge of pressure vessels, diving physiology, and thermodynamics.

==== Unmanned Underwater Vehicles ====
Marine engineers may design or make frequent use of unmanned underwater vehicles, which operate underwater without a human aboard. UUVs often perform work in locations which would be otherwise impossible or difficult to access by humans due to a number of environmental factors (e.g. depth, remoteness, and/or temperature). UUVs can be remotely operated by humans, like in the case of remotely operated vehicles, semi-autonomous, or autonomous.

==== Sensors and instrumentation ====
The development of oceanographic sciences, subsea engineering and the ability to detect, track and destroy submarines (anti-submarine warfare) required the parallel development of a host of marine scientific instrumentation and sensors. Visible light is not transferred far underwater, so the medium for transmission of data is primarily acoustic. High-frequency sound is used to measure the depth of the ocean, determine the nature of the seafloor, and detect submerged objects. The higher the frequency, the higher the definition of the data that is returned. Sound Navigation and Ranging or SONAR was developed during the First World War to detect submarines, and has been greatly refined through to the present day. Submarines similarly use sonar equipment to detect and target other submarines and surface ships, and to detect submerged obstacles such as seamounts that pose a navigational obstacle. Simple echo-sounders point straight down and can give an accurate reading of ocean depth (or look up at the underside of sea-ice). More advanced echo sounders use a fan-shaped beam or sound, or multiple beams to derive highly detailed images of the ocean floor. High power systems can penetrate the soil and seabed rocks to give information about the geology of the seafloor, and are widely used in geophysics for the discovery of hydrocarbons, or for engineering survey. For close-range underwater communications, optical transmission is possible, mainly using blue lasers. These have a high bandwidth compared with acoustic systems, but the range is usually only a few tens of metres, and ideally at night. As well as acoustic communications and navigation, sensors have been developed to measure ocean parameters such as temperature, salinity, oxygen levels and other properties including nitrate levels, levels of trace chemicals and environmental DNA. The industry trend has been towards smaller, more accurate and more affordable systems so that they can be purchased and used by university departments and small companies as well as large corporations, research organisations and governments. The sensors and instruments are fitted to autonomous and remotely-operated systems as well as ships, and are enabling these systems to take on tasks that hitherto required an expensive human-crewed platform. Manufacture of marine sensors and instruments mainly takes place in Asia, Europe and North America. Products are advertised in specialist journals, and through Trade Shows such as Oceanology International and Ocean Business which help raise awareness of the products.

=== Environmental Engineering ===
In every coastal and offshore project, environmental sustainability is an important consideration for the preservation of ocean ecosystems and natural resources. Instances in which marine engineers benefit from knowledge of environmental engineering include creation of fisheries, clean-up of oil spills, and creation of coastal solutions.

=== Offshore Systems ===
A number of systems designed fully or in part by marine engineers are used offshore - far away from coastlines.

==== Offshore oil platforms ====
The design of offshore oil platforms involves a number of marine engineering challenges. Platforms must be able to withstand ocean currents, wave forces, and saltwater corrosion while remaining structurally integral and fully anchored into the seabed. Additionally, drilling components must be engineered to handle these same challenges with a high factor of safety to prevent oil leaks and spills from contaminating the ocean.

==== Offshore wind farms ====
Offshore wind farms encounter many similar marine engineering challenges to oil platforms. They provide a source of renewable energy with a higher yield than wind farms on land, while encountering less resistance from the general public (see NIMBY).

==== Ocean wave energy ====
Marine engineers continue to investigate the possibility of ocean wave energy as a viable source of power for distributed or grid applications. Many designs have been proposed and numerous prototypes have been built, but the problem of harnessing wave energy in a cost-effective manner remains largely unresolved.

=== Port and Harbor Design ===
A marine engineer may also deal with the planning, creation, expansion, and modification of port and harbor designs. Harbors can be natural or artificial and protect anchored ships from wind, waves, and currents. Ports can be defined as a city, town, or place where ships are moored, loaded, or unloaded. Ports typically reside within a harbor and are made up of one or more individual terminals that handle a particular cargo including passengers, bulk cargo, or containerized cargo. Marine engineers plan and design various types of marine terminals and structures found in ports, and they must understand the loads imposed on these structures over the course of their lifetime.

=== Salvage and Recovery ===
Marine salvage techniques are continuously modified and improved to recover shipwrecks. Marine engineers use their skills to assist at some stages of this process.

== Career ==
=== Industry ===
With a diverse engineering background, marine engineers work in a variety of industry jobs across every field of math, science, technology, and engineering. A few companies such as Oceaneering International and Van Oord specialize in marine engineering, while other companies consult marine engineers for specific projects. Such consulting commonly occurs in the oil industry, with companies such as ExxonMobil and BP hiring marine engineers to manage aspects of their offshore drilling projects.

=== Military ===
Marine engineering lends itself to a number of military applications – mostly related to the Navy. The United States Navy's Seabees, Civil Engineer Corps, and Engineering Duty Officers often perform work related to marine engineering. Military contractors (especially those in naval shipyards) and the Army Corps of Engineers play a role in certain marine engineering projects as well.

=== Expected Growth ===
In 2012, the average annual earnings for marine engineers in the U.S. were $96,140 with average hourly earnings of $46.22. As a field, marine engineering is predicted to grow approximately 12% from 2016 to 2026. Currently, there are about 8,200 naval architects and marine engineers employed, however, this number is expected to increase to 9,200 by 2026. This is due at least in part to the critical role of the shipping industry on the global market supply chain; 80% of the world's trade by volume is done overseas by close to 50,000 ships, all of which require marine engineers aboard and shoreside. Additionally, offshore energy continues to grow, and a greater need exists for coastal solutions due to sea level rise.

== Education ==
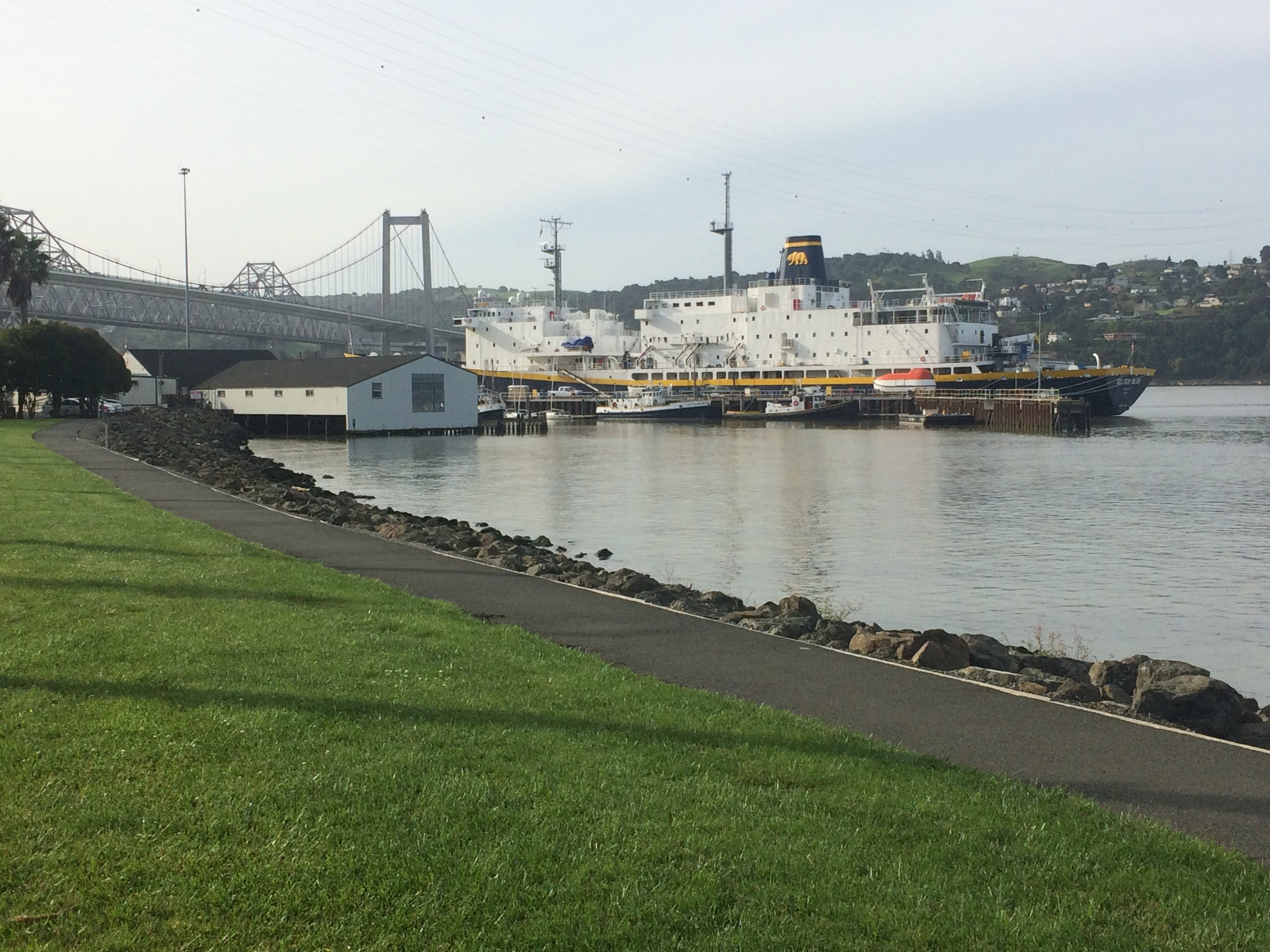
Training Ship Golden Bear docked at California Maritime Academy.

Maritime universities are dedicated to teaching and training students in maritime professions. Marine engineers generally have a bachelor's degree in marine engineering, marine engineering technology, or marine systems engineering. Practical training is valued by employers alongside the bachelor's degree.

=== Professional institutions ===
- IMarEST
- World Maritime University
- Society for Underwater Technology
- IEEE Oceanic Engineering Society
- Marine Engineering and Research Institute
- Indian Maritime University
- Royal Institution of Naval Architects (RINA)
- Pakistan Marine Academy
- Society of Naval Architects and Marine Engineers (SNAME) is a worldwide society that is focused on the advancement of the maritime industry. SNAME was founded in 1893.
- American Society of Naval Engineers (ASNE)
- SIMAC
- Associazione di Ingegneria OffShore e Marina

=== Degrees in ocean engineering ===
A number of institutions - including MIT, UC Berkeley, the U.S. Naval Academy, and Texas A&M University - offer a four-year Bachelor of Science degree specifically in ocean engineering. Accredited programs consist of basic undergraduate math and science subjects such as calculus, statistics, chemistry, and physics; fundamental engineering subjects such as statics, dynamics, electrical engineering, and thermodynamics; and more specialized subjects such as ocean structural analysis, hydromechanics, and coastal management.

Graduate students in ocean engineering take classes on more advanced, in-depth subjects while conducting research to complete a graduate-level thesis. The Massachusetts Institute of Technology offers master's and PhD degrees specifically in ocean engineering. Additionally, MIT co-hosts a joint program with the Woods Hole Oceanographic Institution for students studying ocean engineering and other ocean-related topics at the graduate level.

=== Journals and Conferences ===
Journals about ocean engineering include Ocean Engineering, the IEEE Journal of Oceanic Engineering and the Journal of Waterway, Port, Coastal, and Ocean Engineering.

Conferences in the field of marine engineering include the IEEE Oceanic Engineering Society's OCEANS Conference and Exposition and the European Wave and Tidal Energy Conference (EWTEC).

== Marine Engineering Achievements ==
- The Delta Works is a series of 13 projects designed to protect the Netherlands against flooding from the North Sea. The American Society of Civil Engineers named it one of the "Seven Wonders of the Modern World".
- As of April 2021 twenty-two people have descended to Challenger Deep, the lowest point in the Earth's ocean located in the Mariana Trench.
- Recovery of Soviet submarine K-219 by a joint team of U.S. Navy and CIA engineers aboard Glomar Explorer.

== Notable Marine Engineers ==
=== In Industry ===
- Pieter van Oord, CEO of Royal van Oord

=== In Academia ===
- Michael E. McCormick, professor emeritus of the Department of Naval Architecture and Ocean Engineering at the U.S. Naval Academy and pioneer of wave energy research

== In Media and Popular Culture ==
- Marine engineers performed an important role in the clean-up of oil spills such as Exxon Valdez and British Petroleum.
- James Cameron's documentary Deepsea Challenge follows the story of the team that built a submersible in which Cameron made the first solo descent to Challenger Deep, the lowest point in the Earth's ocean.

== See also ==
- Engine room – Space where the propulsion machinery is installed aboard a ship
- Engineering officer (ship) – Licensed mariner responsible for propulsion plants and support systems
- Marine architecture – Branch of architecture focused on coastal, near-shore and off-shore construction
- Marine electronics
- Naval architecture – Engineering discipline of marine vessels
- Oceanography – Scientific study of the ocean
