= Condon model =

Physical model for chirality

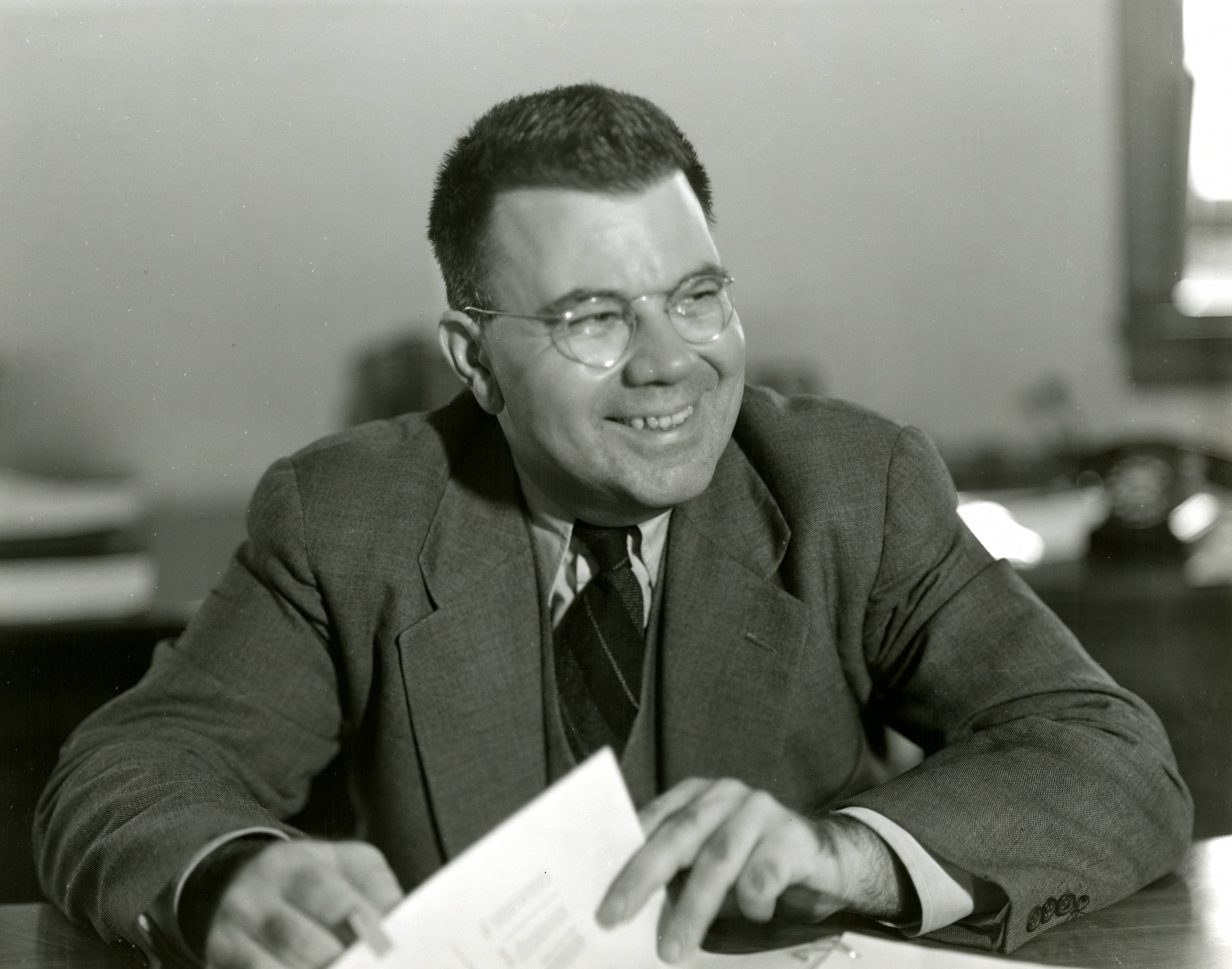
Edward Condon c. late 1940s

In optics and materials science, Condon model is a mathematical formula for the frequency dependence of the chirality parameter of bi-isotropic or bi-anisotropic media. It was reported by Edward Condon, William Altar and Henry Eyring in 1937 in its definitive form, with its earlier forms being introduced by Max Born, Heinrich Gerhard Kuhn and Léon Rosenfeld, among others.

== Mathematical formulation ==
Electric and magnetic constitutive relations for a dispersive and reciprocal chiral material are written as:
$$\begin{align}
\textbf{D} &= \varepsilon(\omega) \textbf{E} - i \kappa(\omega) \sqrt{\varepsilon (\omega) \mu (\omega)} \textbf{H} \\
\textbf{B} &= \mu(\omega) \textbf{H} + i \kappa(\omega) \sqrt{\varepsilon (\omega) \mu (\omega)} \textbf{E}
\end{align}$$

where $\varepsilon(\omega)$ and $\mu(\omega)$ are the frequency-dependent permittivity and magnetic susceptibility. $\kappa(\omega)$ denotes the chirality parameter for magnetoelectric coupling. Using a quantum mechanical treatment of molecular transitions that facilitate chiral behavior, Condon et al. arrives at a single oscillator oscillator expression for the chirality parameter, known as "the one‐electron rotatory power":

$$\kappa(\omega) = \frac{\omega R}{\omega^2 - \omega^2 - i \omega \Gamma}$$

where

- $\omega_0$ is the angular resonant frequency of the molecular transition.
- $\Gamma$ is the damping term.
- $R$ is the rotational strength of the molecular transition.

Alternatively, an expression with multiple oscillators can be used to denote multiple molecular transition between the states$a$ to $b$:

$$\kappa(\omega) = \sum_b \frac{\omega R_{ba}}{\omega_{0,ba}^2 - \omega^2 - i \omega \Gamma_{ba}}$$

Under passivity constraints, imaginary parts of the complex Condon expression and the other constitutive paremeters obey the inequality:

$$\text{Im}\left[\kappa(\omega)\right]^2 < \text{Im}\left[\varepsilon(\omega)\right]\; \text{Im}\left[\mu(\omega)\right] c_0^2$$

where $c_0$ is the speed of light in vacuum. The model is often approximated with a single-pole oscillator whose resonance lies far away from other molecular transitions. The presence of angular frequency ($\omega$) term in the numerator suggests the absence of chirality in the static limit. Since the model is causal and thus obeys the Kramers–Kronig relations, it is used in the time-domain analytical and numerical modeling of wave propagation in chiral media.

Condon model parameters of chiral materials such as glucose solutions and metamaterials can be retrieved from experimental measurements of optical rotatory dispersion and electromagnetic simulation data.

== See also ==
- Franck–Condon principle
- Lorentz oscillator model
