= Sergei Tretyakov =

Sergei Tretyakov may refer to:

- Sergei Tretyakov (arts patron) (1834–1892), Russian philanthropist
- Sergei Tretyakov (writer) (1892–1937), Russian writer
- Sergei Tretyakov (intelligence officer) (1956–2010), Russian who defected to the United States
- Sergei Tretyakov (scientist), Russian-Finnish scientist
