= Ari Sihvola =

Finnish electrical engineer and academic (born 1957)

- Born: Ari Henrik Sihvola; 1957 (age 68–69); Valkeala, Finland
- Education: Helsinki University of Technology
- Known for: Contributions to the electromagnetic theory of complex materials and metamaterials
- Scientific career
- Fields: Electrical engineering
- Workplaces: Helsinki University of Technology; Aalto University
- Thesis: Analysis of microwave structures and mixing formulae with applications to remote sensing measurements (1986)
- Website: users.aalto.fi/~asihvola

Ari Henrik Sihvola (born 1957) is a Finnish electrical engineer and academician, who is a professor emeritus in the Department of Electronics and Nanoengineering at Aalto University. He served as the President of the International Union of Radio Science in the triennium of 2023 to 2026.

Born in Valkeala in 1957, Sihvola received Diploma in Engineering, Licentiate, and PhD degrees from Helsinki University of Technology in 1981, 1984 and 1987, respectively. He has held visiting researchership positions at Research Laboratory of Electronics of Massachusetts Institute of Technology, Pennsylvania State University, Lund University, École Polytechnique Fédérale de Lausanne and Paris-Sud University. From 2005 to 2010, he served as a professor of Academy of Finland.

His recent research interests include electromagnetic theory, complex media, materials modeling, remote sensing and radar applications, as well as engineering education. In 2006, he was named as a Fellow of the IEEE "for contributions to the application of theory in electromagnetic complex media and random materials."

== Selected publications ==
Books

- Lindell, Ismo V.; Sihvola, Ari; Tretyakov, Sergei; Viitanen, Ari J. (1994). Electromagnetic Waves in Chiral and Bi-Isotropic Media. Boston: Artech House. ISBN 978-0-89006-684-3.
- Lindell, Ismo V.; Sihvola, Ari (1994). Sähkömagneettinen kenttäteoria (in Finnish). Helsinki: Otatieto. ISBN 951-672-184-2.
- Sihvola, Ari (1999). Electromagnetic Mixing Formulas and Applications. IEE Electromagnetic Waves Series 47. London: The Institution of Engineering and Technology. ISBN 978-0-85296-772-0.
- Serdyukov, Anatoly; Semchenko, Igor; Tretyakov, Sergei; Sihvola, Ari (2001). Electromagnetics of Bi-anisotropic Materials: Theory and Applications. Gordon and Breach Science Publishers. ISBN 978-9056993276.
- Zouhdi, Said; Sihvola, Ari; Vinogradov, Alexey P. (2009). Metamaterials and Plasmonics: Fundamentals, Modelling, Applications. NATO Science for Peace and Security Series B: Physics and Biophysics. Springer. ISBN 978-1-4020-9406-4.
- Lindell, Ismo V.; Sihvola, Ari (2019). Boundary Conditions in Electromagnetics. Hoboken, NJ: Wiley-IEEE Press. ISBN 978-1-119-56424-9.

Journal articles

- Tiuri, Martti E.; Sihvola, Ari H.; Nyfors, Ebbe G.; Hallikainen, Martti T. (December 1984). "The complex dielectric constant of snow at microwave frequencies". IEEE Journal of Oceanic Engineering. OE-9 (5): 377–382. doi:10.1109/JOE.1984.1145645.
- Sihvola, Ari H.; Kong, Jin Au (July 1988). "Effective permittivity of dielectric mixtures". IEEE Transactions on Geoscience and Remote Sensing. 26 (4): 420–429. doi:10.1109/36.3045.
- Sihvola, Ari H.; Lindell, Ismo V. (1991). "Bi-isotropic constitutive relations". Microwave and Optical Technology Letters. 4 (8): 295–297. doi:10.1002/mop.4650040805.
- Kärkkäinen, Kimmo Kalervo; Sihvola, Ari Henrik; Nikoskinen, Keijo I. (May 2000). "Effective permittivity of mixtures: numerical validation by the FDTD method". IEEE Transactions on Geoscience and Remote Sensing. 38 (3): 1303–1308. doi:10.1109/36.843023.
- Tretyakov, S.; Nefedov, I.; Sihvola, A.; Maslovski, S.; Simovski, C. (2003). "Waves and energy in chiral nihility". Journal of Electromagnetic Waves and Applications. 17 (5): 695–706. arXiv:cond-mat/0211012. doi:10.1163/156939303322226356.
- Lindell, Ismo V.; Sihvola, Ari H. (2005). "Perfect electromagnetic conductor". Journal of Electromagnetic Waves and Applications. 19 (7): 861–869. arXiv:physics/0503232. doi:10.1163/156939305775468741.
- Sihvola, Ari (2007). "Metamaterials in electromagnetics". Metamaterials. 1 (1): 2–11. doi:10.1016/j.metmat.2007.02.003.
