= Ismo Lindell =

Finnish engineer and academician

- Born: Ismo Veikko Ilmari Lindell; 23 November 1939 (age 86); Viipuri, Finland
- Education: Helsinki University of Technology
- Known for: Contributions to electromagnetic theory and engineering education
- Scientific career
- Fields: Electrical engineering
- Workplaces: Helsinki University of Technology; Aalto University

Ismo Veikko Ilmari Lindell (born 23 November 1939) is a Finnish electrical engineer and academician, who is a professor emeritus at Aalto University. Born in Viipuri, Lindell received his doctoral degree in 1971 from Helsinki University of Technology, where he served as Professor of Electromagnetic Theory and founding director of the Electromagnetics Laboratory until his retirement in 2005. From 1996 to 2001, he was a professor of Academy of Finland, and previously held visiting researcher positions at University of Illinois Urbana-Champaign, Massachusetts Institute of Technology and Zhejiang University.

In 1990, he was named as Fellow of the IEEE for "contributions to electromagnetic theory and for the development of education on electromagnetics in Finland." In 2005, he received the International Union of Radio Science Balthasar Van der Pol Gold Medal "for the development of new methods and solutions in electromagnetic field theory and for exceptional didactic skills."

== Selected publications ==
Books

- Lindell, Ismo V. (1995). Methods for Electromagnetic Field Analysis (2nd ed.). New York: IEEE Press / Wiley. ISBN 978-0-7803-6039-6.
- Lindell, Ismo V.; Sihvola, Ari; Tretyakov, Sergei; Viitanen, Ari J. (1994). Electromagnetic Waves in Chiral and Bi-Isotropic Media. Boston: Artech House. ISBN 978-0-89006-684-3.
- Lindell, Ismo V. (2004). Differential Forms in Electromagnetics. New York: Wiley-IEEE Press. ISBN 978-0-471-64801-7.
- Lindell, Ismo (2009). Sähkön pitkä historia. Otatieto-sarja (in Finnish). Helsinki: Gaudeamus. ISBN 978-951-672-358-0.
- Lindell, Ismo V. (2015). Multiforms, Dyadics, and Electromagnetic Media. Hoboken, NJ: Wiley-IEEE Press. ISBN 978-1-119-05162-6.
- Lindell, Ismo V. (2019). Boundary Conditions in Electromagnetics. Hoboken, NJ: Wiley-IEEE Press. ISBN 978-1-119-56424-9.

Journal articles

- Lindell, Ismo V.; Alanen, Esko (February 1984). "Exact image theory for the Sommerfeld half-space problem, part I: Vertical magnetic dipole". IEEE Transactions on Antennas and Propagation. AP-32 (2): 126–133. Bibcode:1984ITAP...32..126L. doi:10.1109/TAP.1984.1143278.
- Lindell, Ismo V.; Alanen, Esko (August 1984). "Exact image theory for the Sommerfeld half-space problem, part II: Vertical electric dipole". IEEE Transactions on Antennas and Propagation. AP-32 (8): 841–847. Bibcode:1984ITAP...32..841L. doi:10.1109/TAP.1984.1143431.
- Lindell, Ismo V.; Alanen, Esko (October 1984). "Exact image theory for the Sommerfeld half-space problem, part III: General formulation". IEEE Transactions on Antennas and Propagation. AP-32 (10): 1027–1032. Bibcode:1984ITAP...32.1027L. doi:10.1109/TAP.1984.1143204.
- Sihvola, Ari H.; Lindell, Ismo V. (1991). "Bi-isotropic constitutive relations". Microwave and Optical Technology Letters. 4 (8): 295–297. Bibcode:1991MiOTL...4..295S. doi:10.1002/mop.4650040805.
- Lindell, Ismo V.; Tretyakov, Sergei A.; Nikoskinen, Keijo I.; Ilvonen, Sami (October 2001). "BW media—media with negative parameters, capable of supporting backward waves". Microwave and Optical Technology Letters. 31 (2): 129–133. Bibcode:2001MiOTL..31..129L. doi:10.1002/mop.1378.
- Lindell, Ismo V.; Sihvola, Ari H. (2005). "Perfect electromagnetic conductor". Journal of Electromagnetic Waves and Applications. 19 (7): 861–869. arXiv:physics/0503232. Bibcode:2005JEWA...19..861L. doi:10.1163/156939305775468741.
- Lindell, Ismo V.; Sihvola, Ari H. (September 2005). "Transformation method for problems involving perfect electromagnetic conductor (PEMC) structures". IEEE Transactions on Antennas and Propagation. 53 (9): 3005–3011. Bibcode:2005ITAP...53.3005L. doi:10.1109/TAP.2005.854519.
- Lindell, Ismo V.; Sihvola, Ari H. (September 2005). "Realization of the PEMC boundary". IEEE Transactions on Antennas and Propagation. 53 (9): 3012–3018. Bibcode:2005ITAP...53.3012L. doi:10.1109/TAP.2005.854524.
- Lindell, Ismo V.; Sihvola, Ari H. (February 2009). "Electromagnetic boundary and its realization with anisotropic metamaterial". Physical Review E. 79 (2) 026604. Bibcode:2009PhRvE..79b6604L. doi:10.1103/PhysRevE.79.026604.
