= Xiaojia Wang =

Chinese-American mechanical engineer

Xiaojia "XJ" Wang is a Chinese-American mechanical engineer whose research studies energy transport at the nanoscale, and particularly thermal conductivity of thin films, polymers, and nanomaterials, using techniques including ultrafast laser pumping and time-domain thermoreflectance. She is a professor of mechanical engineering at the University of Minnesota, where she heads the Micro/Nanoscale Thermal Transport Laboratory.

== Education and career ==
Wang studied thermal engineering at Xi'an Jiaotong University, receiving a bachelor's degree in 2004 and a master's degree in 2007. She completed a Ph.D. in 2011, in heat transfer and mechanical engineering, at Georgia Tech. Her dissertation, Study of the radiative properties of aligned carbon nanotubes and silver nanorods, was supervised by Zhuomin Zhang.

After postdoctoral research at the University of Illinois Urbana-Champaign, she joined the University of Minnesota as Benjamin Mayhugh Assistant Professor in Mechanical Engineering in 2014. She added affiliations with the departments of Electrical & Computer Engineering in 2016 and Chemical Engineering and Materials Science in 2020. She was promoted to associate professor in 2020, and to full professor in 2025.

== Recognition ==
Wang was named as an ASME Fellow in 2025.
