= Sihvola =

Sihvola is a Finnish surname. Notable people with the surname include:

- Ari Sihvola (born 1957), Finnish engineer and academician
- Aukusti Sihvola (1895–1947), Finnish sport wrestler
- Juha Sihvola (1957–2012), Finnish philosopher and historian
- Pekka Sihvola (born 1984), Finnish footballer
