= Constitutive =

Constitutive may refer to:

- In physics, a constitutive equation is a relation between two physical quantities
- In ecology, a constitutive defense is one that is always active, as opposed to an inducible defense
- Constitutive theory of statehood
- In biochemistry and pharmacology, a constitutively active receptor produces a biological response in the absence of a bound ligand
- In genetics, a constitutive gene is always expressed – see constitutive expression
