= Associazione di Ingegneria OffShore e Marina =

AIOM, Associazione di Ingegneria Offshore e Marina
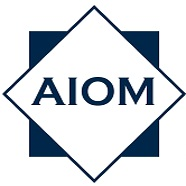
- Formation: February 20, 1982
- Type: Engineering Society
- Headquarters: Milan, Italy
- Members: 110
- Official language: Italian
- President: Elio Ciralli (since 2007)
- Key people: 12
- Staff: 2
- Website: www.aiom.info

The Associazione di Ingegneria Offshore e Marina (AIOM) is an Italian non-profit association that seeks to further the knowledge and study of marine engineering. The association was founded in Milan in 1982 to create a forum for scientists and engineers involved in maritime professional activities. AIOM organizes congresses, conferences, seminars and other events to promote the continuing education and advancement of industry professionals. The organization has cooperated with several national and international bodies during its activities (e.g.ASME, IALCCE) and celebrated its 30th anniversary in 2012.

== Organization ==
AIOM's main body is the assembly of members that operate through a directorate and a president. AIOM has several operative centers, located in Italian universities.

== Operative units ==
AIOM has the following operational centers (Sedi Operative AIOM):

- Sede Operativa AIOM di Bologna
- Sede Operativa AIOM della Campania
- Sede Operativa AIOM di Genova
- Sede Operativa AIOM di Palermo
- Sede Operativa AIOM di Reggio Calabria
- Sede Operativa AIOM del Salento
- Sede Operativa AIOM di Ancona

== Bulletins ==
AIOM publishes bulletins reporting technical articles of scientists and technicians involved with maritime and off-shore engineering.

== Giornate AIOM and Studi di Aggiornamento sull'Ingegneria Off-Shore e Marina ==
AIOM organizes regular congresses and events. "Giornate AIOM" were useful meetings for experts and technicians involved in these fields. AIOM organizes regularly follow-up studies on maritime and off-shore engineering. The last editions were:

- Studi di aggiornamento AIOM 2011 - Università di Lecce
- Studi di aggiornamento AIOM 2012 - Università di Reggio Calabria
- Studi di aggiornamento AIOM 2013 - Università di Bologna
- Studi di aggiornamento AIOM 2014 - Università di Palermo

== Plaque to careers ==
In 2012 AIOM began recognizing regularly "AIOM Plaques" to award distinguished personalities in fields of interest.

== Award for university degree thesis ==
In 2014, AIOM initiated an annual award to recognize the excellency of a university degree thesis in the marine and offshore engineering field.
