= Time-domain thermoreflectance =

Lab technique for measuring thermal properties through analyzing reflective properties

Time-domain thermoreflectance (TDTR) is a method by which the thermal properties of a material can be measured, most importantly thermal conductivity. This method can be applied most notably to thin film materials (up to hundreds of nanometers thick), which have properties that vary greatly when compared to the same materials in bulk. The idea behind this technique is that once a material is heated up, the change in the reflectance of the surface can be utilized to derive the thermal properties. The reflectivity is measured with respect to time, and the data received can be matched to a model with coefficients that correspond to thermal properties.

== Experiment setup ==
The technique of this method is based on the monitoring of acoustic waves that are generated with a pulsed laser. Localized heating of a material will create a localized temperature increase, which induces thermal stress. This stress build in a localized region causes an acoustic strain pulse. At an interface, the pulse will be subjected to a transmittance/reflectance state, and the characteristics of the interface may be monitored with the reflected waves. A probe laser will detect the effects of the reflecting acoustic waves by sensing the piezo-optic effect.

The amount of strain is related to the optical laser pulse as follows. Take the localized temperature increase due to the laser,

$$\Delta T(z) = (1 - R) \frac{Q}{C(\zeta A)} \exp(-z/\zeta),$$

where R is the sample reflectivity, Q is the optical pulse energy, C is the specific heat (per unit volume), A is the optical spot area, ζ is the optical absorption length, and z is the distance into the sample. This temperature increase results in a strain that can be estimated by multiplying it with the linear coefficient of thermal expansion of the film. Usually, a typical magnitude value of the acoustic pulse will be small, and for long propagation nonlinear effects could become important. But propagation of such short duration pulses will suffer acoustic attenuation if the temperature is not very low. Thus, this method is most efficient with the utilization of surface acoustic waves, and studies on investigation of this method toward lateral structures are being conducted.

To sense the piezo-optic effect of the reflected waves, fast monitoring is required due to the travel time of the acoustic wave and heat flow. Acoustic waves travel a few nanometers in a picosecond, where heat flows about a hundred nanometers in a second. Thus, lasers such as titanium sapphire (Ti:Al_{2}O_{3}) laser, with pulse width of ~200 fs, are used to monitor the characteristics of the interface. Other type of lasers include Yb:fiber, Yb:tungstate, Er:fiber, Nd:glass. Second-harmonic generation may be utilized to achieve frequency of double or higher.

The output of the laser is split into pump and probe beams by a half-wave plate followed by a polarizing beam splitter leading to a cross-polarized pump and probe. The pump beam is modulated on the order of a few megahertz by an acousto-optic or electro-optic modulator and focused onto the sample with a lens. The probe is directed into an optical delay line. The probe beam is then focused with a lens onto the same spot on the sample as the pulse. Both pump and probe have a spot size on the order of 10–50 μm. The reflected probe light is input to a high bandwidth photodetector. The output is fed into a lock-in amplifier whose reference signal has the same frequency used to modulate the pump. The voltage output from the lock-in will be proportional to the change in reflectivity (ΔR). Recording this signal as the optical delay line is changed provides a measurement of ΔR as a function of optical probe-pulse time delay.

== Modeling materials ==
The surface temperature of a single layer

The frequency domain solution for a semi-infinite solid which is heated by a point source with angular frequency $\omega$ can be expressed by the following equation:

$g(r)=\frac {\exp(-qr)} {(2 \pi \Lambda r)}$, where $q^2 = (iw/d)$.

Here, Λ is the thermal conductivity of the solid, D is the thermal diffusivity of the solid, and r is the radial coordinate. In a typical time-domain thermoreflectance experiment, the co-aligned laser beams have cylindrical symmetry, therefore the Hankel transform can be used to simplify the computation of the convolution of the equation with the distributions of the laser intensities.

Here $g(r)$ is radially symmetric and by the definition of Hankel transform,

$$G(k) = 2 \pi \int_0^{\infty} g(r) J_0 (2 \pi k r) r \,dr = \frac {1} {\Lambda (4 \pi^2 k^2 + q^2)^{1/2}}.$$

Since the pump and probe beams used here have Gaussian distribution, the $1/e^2$ radius of the pump and probe beam are $w_0$ and $w_1$ respectively. The surface is heated by the pump laser beam with the intensity $p(r)$, i.e.

$$p(r) = \frac {2A} {\pi w_0^2} \exp(-2r^2/ w_0^2),$$

where $A$ is the amplitude of the heat absorbed by the sample at frequency $\omega$. Then the Hankel transform of $p(r)$ is

$$P(k) = A \exp(-\pi^2k^2\omega_0^2/2)$$.

Then the distributions of temperature oscillations at the surface $\theta(r)$ is the inverse Hankel transforms of the product $G(k)$ and $P(k)$, i.e.

$$\theta (r) = 2 \pi \int_0^{\infty} P(k) G(k) J_0 (2 \pi k r) k dk.$$

The surface temperatures are measured due to the change in the reflectivity $R$ with the temperature $T$, i.e. $dR/dT$, while this change is measured by the changes in the reflected intensity of a probe laser beam. The probe laser beam measures a weighted average of the temperature $\theta(r)$, i.e.

$$\Delta T = \frac{4}{w_1^2} \int_0^\infty \theta(r)\exp\left(-\frac{2r^2}{w_1^2}\right).$$

This last integral can be simplified to an integral over $k$:

$$\Delta T = 2 \pi A \int_0^{\infty} G(k) \exp (-\pi^2k^2(\omega_0^2 + \omega_1^2)/2) k dk.$$

The surface temperature of a layered structure

In the similar way, frequency domain solution for the surface temperature of a layered structure can be acquired. $G(k)$ for a layered structure is

$$G(k) = (\frac {B_1^+ + B_1^-} {B_1^- - B_1^+}) \frac {1} {\gamma_1},$$

where

$\left( \begin{array}{c} B^+ \\ B^- \end{array} \right)_{n} = \frac {1} {2 \gamma_n} \left( \begin{array}{cc} \exp(-u_n L_n) & 0 \\ 0 & \exp(u_n L_n) \end{array} \right) \left( \begin{array}{cc} \gamma_n + \gamma_{n+1} & \gamma_n - \gamma_{n+1} \\ \gamma_n - \gamma_{n+1} & \gamma_n + \gamma_{n+1}\end{array} \right)\left( \begin{array}{c} B^+ \\ B^- \end{array} \right)_{n+1}$, $u_n = (4 \pi^2 k^2 + q_n^2)^{1/2}, q_n^2 = \frac {iw} {D_n}, \gamma_n=\Lambda _n u_n$.

Here Λ_{n} is the thermal conductivity of nth layer, D_{n} is the thermal diffusivity of nth layer, and L_{n} is the thickness of nth layer. Then we can calculate the changes of temperature of a layered structure as before using the updated $G(k)$.

Modeling of data acquired in time-domain thermoreflectance

The acquired data from time-domain thermoreflectance experiments are required to be compared with the model.

$$Re[\Delta R M (t)] = \frac {dR} {dT} \sum_{m=-M}^M (\Delta T(m/\tau + f) + \Delta T (m/\tau - f))\exp(i2\pi m t /\tau),$$

$$Im[\Delta R M (t)] = -i \frac {dR} {dT} \sum_{m=-M}^M (\Delta T(m/\tau + f) - \Delta T (m/\tau - f))\exp(i2\pi m t /\tau),$$

$$\frac {V_f (t)} {V_0} = \frac {Q} {\sqrt{2}} \frac {\Delta R (t)} {R},$$

where Q is the quality factor of the resonant circuit. This calculated $V_f/V_0$ would be compared with the measured one.

== Application ==
Through this process of time-domain thermoreflectance, the thermal properties of many materials can be obtained. Common test setups include having multiple metal blocks connected together in a diffusion multiple, where once subjected to high temperatures various compounds can be created as a result of the diffusion of two adjacent metal blocks. An example would be a Ni-Cr-Pd-Pt-Rh-Ru diffusion multiple which would have diffusion zones of Ni-Cr, Ni-Pd, Ni-Pt and so on. In this way, many different materials can be tested at the same time. Lowest thermal conductivity for a thin film of solid, fully dense material (i.e. not porous) was also recently reported with measurements using this method.

Once this test sample is obtained, time-domain thermoreflectance measurements can take place, with laser pulses of very short duration for both the pump and the probe lasers (<1 ps). The thermoreflected signal is then measured by a photodiode which is connected to a RF lock-in amplifier. The signals that come out of the amplifier consist of an in phase and out of phase component, and the ratio of these allow thermal conductivity data to be measured for a specific delay time.

The data received from this process can then be compared to a thermal model, and the thermal conductivity and thermal conductance can then be derived. It is found that these two parameters can be derived independently based on the delay times, with short delay times (0.1–0.5 ns) resulting in the thermal conductivity and longer delay times (> 2ns) resulting in the thermal conductance.

There is much room for error involved due to phase errors in the RF amplifier in addition to noise from the lasers. Typically, however, accuracy can be found to be within 8%.

== See also ==
- Thermal conductivity measurement
