= Microwave and Optical Technology Letters =

- Discipline: Microwave engineering, optics
- Language: English
- Edited by: Wenquan Che

Publication details
- History: 1988-present
- Publisher: Wiley-Blackwell
- Frequency: Monthly
- Impact factor: 1.2 (2024)

Standard abbreviations
- ISO 4: Microw. Opt. Technol. Lett.

Indexing
- ISSN: 0895-2477 (print); 1098-2760 (web)
- LCCN: 88640906
- OCLC no.: 38552382

Links
- Journal homepage; Online access; Online archive

Microwave and Optical Technology Letters is a monthly peer-reviewed scientific journal published by Wiley-Blackwell. The editor-in-chief is Kai Chang (Texas A&M University). The journal covers technology that operates in wavelengths ranging from radio frequency to the optical spectrum.

== Abstracting and indexing ==
This journal is abstracted and indexed in:

- Science Citation Index Expanded
- Scopus
- Academic Search
- Ceramic Abstracts
- Compendex
- Advanced Polymer Abstracts
- Civil Engineering Abstracts
- Mechanical & Transportation Engineering Abstracts
- Current Abstracts
- Current Contents/Engineering, Computing & Technology
- Engineered Materials Abstracts
- INSPEC
- Computer & Information Systems Abstracts
- Materials Business File
- METADEX
- Earthquake Engineering Abstracts
- International Aerospace Abstracts & Database
- Technology Research Database
- Computer Information & Technology Abstracts

According to the Journal Citation Reports, the journal has a 2024 impact factor of 1.2.
