= Che Feng =

Chinese business mogul

Che Feng (Chinese: 车峰; born 1970) is a Chinese business mogul and the son-in-law of former People's Bank of China governor Dai Xianglong. He is currently under investigation by the authorities, suspected of corruption.

== Biography ==
Born in Hefei, Anhui province, Che was the third of three sons of a former soldier of the People's Liberation Army. He received a middle school education. In his youth, Che arrived in Shanghai to run a small business selling clothing. He met Dai Rong, daughter of Dai Xianglong, who became attracted to Che due to his sturdy build and height. Through his political connections, Che moved into the real estate business in Shanghai and Hainan. In 2004, Che secured a loan worth over 200 million yuan and collaborated with Hopson Development to build a 34-story office building in the Lujiazui financial district of Shanghai.

By 2015, Che had controlled some 30 companies and was a highly recognized name in Chinese investment circles. Che was reported to hold a large stake in the Hong Kong Stock Exchange-listed production company Digital Domain.

Che was said to have purchased – through a series of complex arrangements and financing through debt – the original shares of Haitong Securities and Ping'an Insurance in a case that not only implicated his father-in-law Dai Xianglong, but also was linked to the family and associates of then Chinese Premier Wen Jiabao. Upon the respective company's initial public offerings, Che was said to have gained a total sum of 8.8 billion yuan (~$1.3 billion).

Che was also linked to Zeng Wei, son of Zeng Qinghong.

Che was a major player in one of the most lurid corruption scandals during the anti-corruption crackdown under Xi Jinping. Che was said to have leveraged various shell companies based in the British Virgin Islands to perform complex corporate maneuvers. He relied on support from former state intelligence official Ma Jian, who was introduced to Che by another renowned business mogul Guo Wengui; it was said that Che helped inject some 600 million yuan of cash to Guo's fledgling investments and the two became good friends. It was said that the Ma Jian case opened way for the Central Commission for Discipline Inspection to investigate Che.

Che was placed under investigation on June 2, 2015, on a trip to Beijing. Prior to that, he resided mostly in Hong Kong.
