= Che Hongcai =

Chinese linguist (1936–2026)

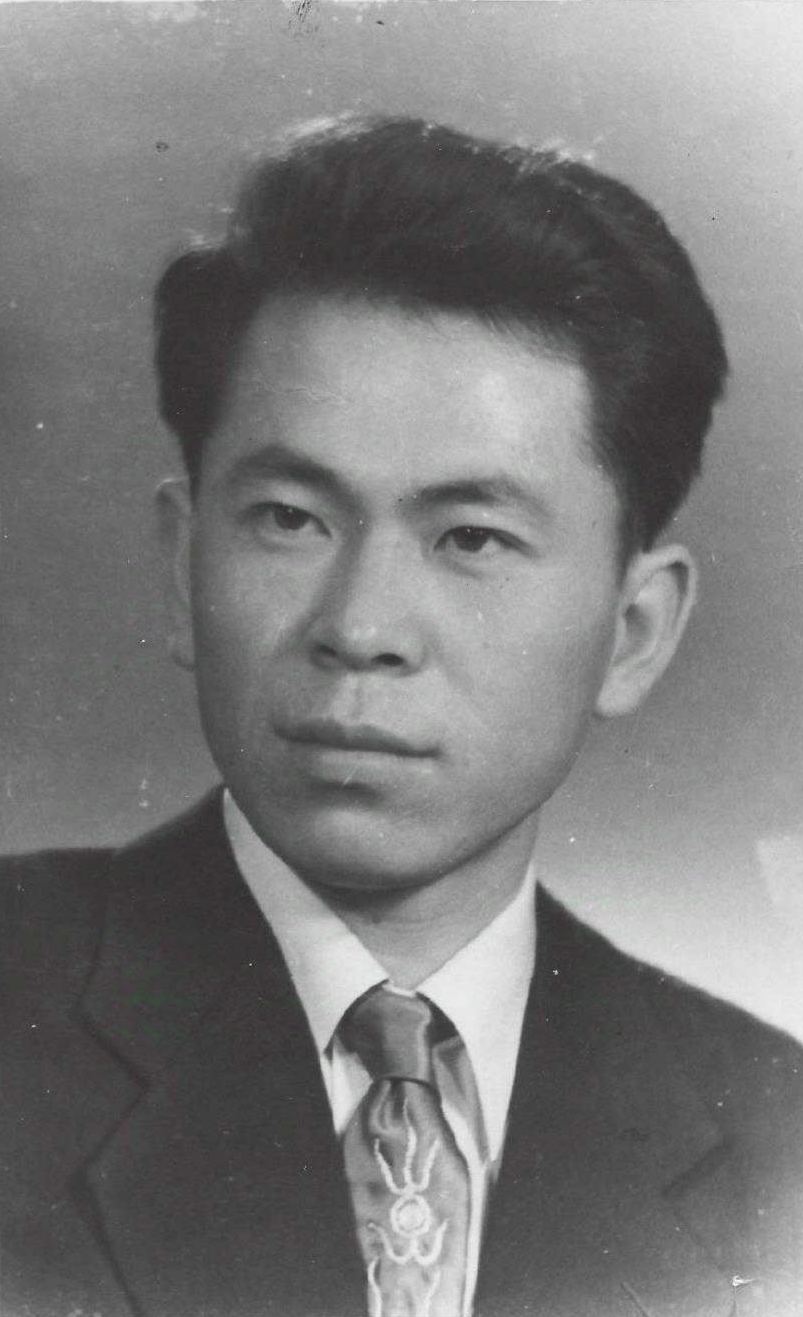
Che Hongcai

Che Hongcai (Chinese: 车洪才, 1936 – 11 October 2026) was a Chinese linguist and lexicographer, who was a professor of the Communication University of China, specialising in Pashto language. He was the editor-in-chief of the first Pashto-Chinese dictionary.

== Early life and education ==
Che was born in Hailun City, Heilongjiang Province, China, in 1936. Che was enrolled as an English major in Beijing Foreign Studies University in 1957. He was sent to the Cultural Institute of Kabul University to study Pashto language by the Chinese Foreign Ministry from 1959 to 1963.

== Career ==
When Che returned to China, he arranged to establish the Pashto service of China International Radio. When the Cultural Revolution began, Che was sent to Tangshan in 1968, doing farm work and attending military drills there every day. In 1975, the China's State Council decided to publish a branch of Chinese foreign language dictionaries, including Pashto-Chinese dictionary. Che, then a teacher at Beijing Broadcasting Institute (the predecessor of the Communication University of China), was contacted by the Commercial Press in 1978 and entrusted with compiling the dictionary. By 1981, with the assistance of his students, Song Qiangmin, and a former classmate in Kabul University, Zhang Min, Che had completed 100,000 cards that filled more than 30 filing cabinets. About 70% of the project was done at the time. However, in 1982, the compiling was interrupted by the university authorities, who required Che to research into the possibility of creating an international journalism major. In 1989, Che was appointed an envoy by Chinese Foreign Ministry, firstly to Pakistan, then to Afghanistan. When he returned to China in 1993, Che found out that the dictionary project was forgotten by editors of the Commercial Press and the university authorities. Che retired in 1995. In 2000, the Communication University of China invited Che back to teach Pashto. In 2008, Che finished his teaching and rebooted his dictionary project. He taught himself how to use the computer and collaborated with his former classmate working in the Beijing Radio & Television Station. In April 2012, Che finally finished the dictionary and delivered the draft to the Commercial Press. The editors of the Commercial Press were stunned at first, but then they rediscovered the original 1978 document, confirming that the dictionary project did exist.

In 2015, the Pashto-Chinese Dictionary was formally published by the commercial press.

== Death ==
Che died on 11 October 2026, at the age of 90.

== Honors ==
In 2015, Che was awarded Sayed Jamaluddin Afghan prestigious state medal. The award was in recognition of his 36-year-long hardship compiling the first Pashto-Chinese Dictionary. Che has also been awarded for his contribution to promoting the bilateral cultural exchanges and the friendship of the two peoples.
