= Bi-isotropic material =

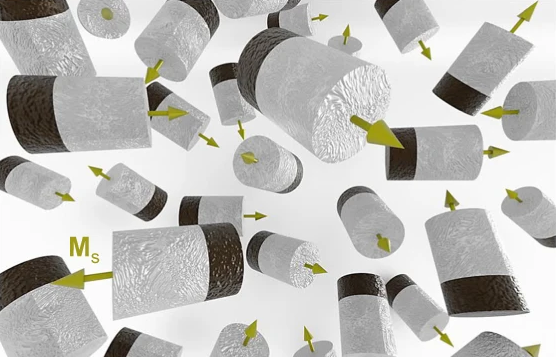
Schematic of a proposed bi-isotropic metamaterial design with nonreciprocal Tellegen response

In physics, engineering and materials science, a bi-isotropic material is an isotropic medium where the electric and magnetic flux densities are linearly coupled to both the electric and magnetic fields via scalar constitutive relations, including magnetoelectric coupling terms. A major subset of such materials, known as Pasteur media, are optically active: they can rotate the polarization of light in either refraction or transmission. This does not mean all materials with twist effect fall in the bi-isotropic class. The twist effect of the class of bi-isotropic materials is caused by the chirality and/or non-reciprocity of the structure of the media, in which the electric and magnetic field of an electromagnetic wave (or simply, light) interact in an unusual way.

Acoustic analog of bi-anisotropy is known as Willis coupling.

== Definition ==
For most materials, the electric field $E$ and electric displacement field $D$ (as well as the magnetic field $B$ and inductive magnetic field $H$) are parallel to one another. These simple mediums are called isotropic, and the relationships between the fields can be expressed using constants. For more complex materials, such as crystals and many metamaterials, these fields are not necessarily parallel. When one set of the fields are parallel, and one set are not, the material is called anisotropic. Crystals typically have $D$ fields which are not aligned with the $E$ fields, while the $B$ and $H$ fields remain related by a constant. Materials where either pair of fields is not parallel are called anisotropic.

In bi-isotropic media, the electric and magnetic fields are coupled. The constitutive relations are

$$D = \varepsilon E + \xi H\,$$

$$B = \mu H + \zeta E\,$$

$D$, $E$, $B$, $H$, $\varepsilon$ and $\mu$ are corresponding to usual electromagnetic qualities. $\xi$ and $\zeta$ are the coupling constants, which is the intrinsic constant of each media.

This can be generalized to the case where $\varepsilon$ , $\mu$, $\xi$ and $\zeta$ are tensors (i.e. they depend on the direction within the material), in which case the media is referred to as bi-anisotropic.

== Coupling constant ==
ξ and ζ can be further related to the Tellegen (referred to as reciprocity) χ and chirality κ parameter

$$\chi - i \kappa = \frac{\xi }{\sqrt{\varepsilon \mu}}$$

$$\chi + i \kappa = \frac{\zeta }{\sqrt{\varepsilon \mu}}$$

after substitution of the above equations into the constitutive relations, gives

$$D = \varepsilon E+ (\chi - i \kappa) \sqrt{\varepsilon \mu} H$$

$$B = \mu H + (\chi + i \kappa) \sqrt{\varepsilon \mu} E$$

Frequency dependence of the chirality parameter can be described by Condon model.

== Classification ==
	Non-chiral $\kappa = 0$	Chiral $\kappa \neq 0$
Reciprocal $\chi = 0$	Simple isotropic medium	Pasteur medium
Non-reciprocal $\chi \neq 0$	Tellegen medium	General bi-isotropic medium

== Examples ==
Pasteur media can be made by mixing metal helices of one handedness into a resin. Care must be exercised to secure isotropy: the helices must be randomly oriented so that there is no special direction.

The magnetoelectric effect can be understood from the helix as it is exposed to the electromagnetic field. The helix geometry can be considered as an inductor. For such a structure the magnetic component of an EM wave induces a current on the wire and further influences the electric component of the same EM wave.

From the constitutive relations, for Pasteur media, χ = 0,

$$D = \varepsilon E - i \kappa \sqrt{\varepsilon \mu} H.$$

Hence, the D field is delayed by a phase i due to the response from the H field.

Tellegen media is the opposite of Pasteur media, which is electromagnetic: the electric component will cause the magnetic component to change. Such a medium is not as straightforward as the concept of handedness. Electric dipoles bonded with magnets belong to this kind of media. When the dipoles align themselves to the electric field component of the EM wave, the magnets will also respond, as they are bounded together. The change in direction of the magnets will therefore change the magnetic component of the EM wave, and so on.

From the constitutive relations, for Tellegen media, κ = 0,

$$B = \mu H + \chi \sqrt{\varepsilon \mu} E$$

This implies that the B field responds in phase with the H field.

== See also ==
- Anisotropy
- Chirality (electromagnetism)
- Metamaterial
- Reciprocity (electromagnetism)
- Maxwell's_equations#Constitutive_relations
