= Electrochlorination =

Producing hypochlorite by electric current through salt water

Electrochlorination is the process of producing hypochlorite by passing electric current through salt water. This disinfects the water and makes it safe for human use, such as for drinking water or swimming pools.

== Process ==
The process of electrochlorination is a simple application based on the chloralkali process (in an unpartitioned cell).

It is the electrolysis of saltwater to produce a chlorinated solution. The first step is removing any solids from the saltwater. Next, the saltwater streams through an electrolyzer cell's channel of decreasing thickness. One side of the channel is a cathode, the other is an anode. A low voltage DC current is applied, electrolysis happens producing sodium hypochlorite and hydrogen gas (H_{2}). The solution travels to a tank that separates the hydrogen gas based on its low density. Only water and sodium chloride are used. The simplified chemical reaction is:

NaCl + H_{2}O + energy → NaOCl + H_{2}

That is, energy is added to sodium chloride (table salt) in water, producing sodium hypochlorite and hydrogen gas.

Because the reaction takes place in an unpartitioned cell and NaOH is present in the same solution as the Cl_{2}:

2 NaCl + 2 H_{2}O → 2 NaOH + H_{2} + Cl_{2}

any Cl_{2} disproportionates to hypochlorite and chloride

Cl_{2} + 2 NaOH → NaCl + NaClO + H_{2}O

resulting in a hypochlorite solution.

=== Seawater ===
Companies may use seawater for this process due to its low cost. The water used is usually brackish water or brine (i.e. a solution with >0.5% salinity). In these cases, additional contaminant chemicals may be present in the water feed. The low voltage DC current still performs electrochlorination. The excess chemicals are left untouched and can be easily discarded.

== Products ==
The product of the process, sodium hypochlorite, provides 0.7% to 1% chlorine. Anything below the concentration of 1% chlorine is considered a non-hazardous chemical although still a very effective disinfectant. The sodium hypochlorite produced is in the range of pH 6-7.5, relatively neutral in regards to acidity or alkalinity. At that pH range, the sodium hypochlorite is relatively stable.

== Applications ==
=== Drinking water ===
Water treatment plants have evolved their technology over the years to tackle health threats due to water contamination eg cholera, typhoid, and dysentery. Treatment plants began to implement chlorination. Chlorination virtually wiped out both the spread and initial contamination of these diseases, and did so in a way that earned it the title of "probably the most significant public health advance of the millennium" from Life Magazine.

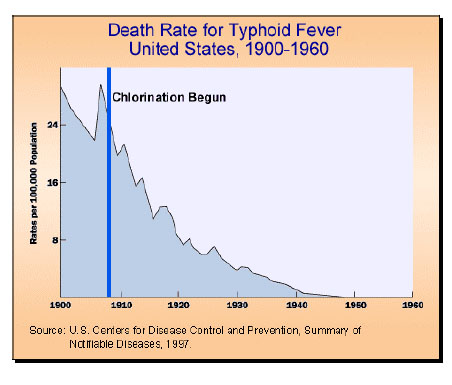
Rates of death due to typhoid fever in the US declined rapidly after water chlorination began.

Electrochlorination is the next step in the evolution of this process. It chlorinates drinking water without producing environmental toxins. Unlike other chlorination techniques, electrochlorination generates no sludge or by-products other than hydrogen which must be managed safely. It is safer for the operators of the chlorinators as there is no handling of chlorine gas, which is highly toxic and corrosive. A risk assessment is required as the hydrogen released is flammable and explosive.

=== Swimming pools ===
When a swimmer enters a pool, they add up to one billion organisms to the water. Chlorination kills all organisms harmful to swimmers such as those that cause ear infections and athlete's foot. The advantages of electrochlorination in this process are as follows:

- Not irritating to skin or soft tissue.
- Active in small concentrations.
- Longer lifespan of chemical and therefore less replacement necessary.
- Easily measurable.
