= Lithium iodate =

- Skeletal formula of lithium iodate with I—O bond length

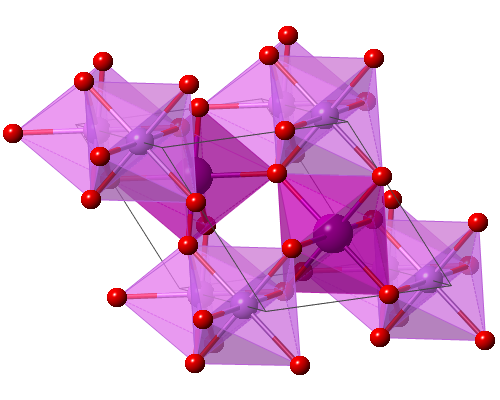
- Crystal structure of lithium iodate, iodines are inside the unit cell

Names
- IUPAC name Lithium iodate

Identifiers
CAS Number	13765-03-2
3D model (JSmol)	Interactive image
ChemSpider	141432
ECHA InfoCard	100.033.954
EC Number	237-365-2
PubChem CID	23687747
UNII	1685PBD1HF
UN number	1479
CompTox Dashboard (EPA)	DTXSID601014446
- InChI: InChI=1S/HIO3.Li/c2-1(3)4;/h(H,2,3,4);/q;+1/p-1 Key: FZAXZVHFYFGNBX-UHFFFAOYSA-M
- SMILES: [Li+].[O-]I(=O)=O

Properties
Chemical formula	LiIO_{3}
Appearance	White hygroscopic crystals
Odor	Odorless
Density	4.487 g/cm^{3}
Melting point	420–450 °C (788–842 °F; 693–723 K)
Solubility in water	Anhydrous: 89.4 g/100 mL (10 °C); 82.7 g/100 mL (25 °C); 78.4 g/100 mL (40.1 °C); 73 g/100 mL (75.6 °C); Hemihydrate: 80.2 g/100 mL (18 °C)
Solubility	Insoluble in EtOH
Magnetic susceptibility (χ)	−47.0·10^{−6} cm^{3}/mol
Thermal conductivity	1.27 W/m·K (a-axis); 0.65 W/m·K (c-axis)
Refractive index (n_{D})	1.8875 (20 °C); 1.6 (RT) n_{He–Ne}: 1.8815 (20 °C); 1.5928 (RT)

Structure
Crystal structure	Hexagonal, hP10
Space group	P6_{3}22, No. 182
Point group	622
Lattice constant	a = 5.46(9) Å, c = 5.15(5) Å α = 90°, β = 90°, γ = 120°

Hazards
- GHS labelling
Pictograms	(GHS03: Oxidizing) (GHS07: Exclamation mark) (GHS08: Health hazard)
Signal word	Danger
Hazard statements	H272, H315, H319, H335, H360
Precautionary statements	P201, P220, P261, P305+P351+P338, P308+P313
NFPA 704 (fire diamond)	2 0 2
- Except where otherwise noted, data are given for materials in their standard state (at 25 °C [77 °F], 100 kPa). verify (what is ?) Infobox references

Lithium iodate (LiIO_{3}) is a chemical compound that forms a negative uniaxial crystal that can be used for nonlinear, acousto-optical and piezoelectric applications. It has been utilized for 347 nm ruby lasers.

== Properties ==
Mohs hardness of lithium iodate is 3.5–4. Its linear thermal expansion coefficient at 298 K (25 °C; 77 °F) is 2.8·10^{−5}/°C (a-axis) and 4.8·10^{−5}/°C (c-axis). Its transition to β-form begin at 50 °C (122 °F) and it is irreversible.
