= Piezooptic effect =

The piezooptic effect is manifest as a change in refractive index, n, of a material caused by a change in pressure on that material. Early demonstrations of the piezooptic effect were done on liquids. The effect has since been demonstrated in solid, crystalline materials.
