= IEEE Journal of Oceanic Engineering =

- Discipline: Engineering
- Language: English
- Edited by: von Ellenrieder, Karl

Publication details
- Publisher: IEEE
- Frequency: quarterly
- Open access: hybrid
- Impact factor: 5.6 (2025)

Standard abbreviations
- ISO 4: IEEE J. Ocean. Eng.

Indexing
- ISSN: 0364-9059 (print); 1558-1691 (web)

The IEEE Journal of Oceanic Engineering is a journal published by the Institute of Electrical and Electronics Engineers. The journal's editor-in-chief is Karl von Ellenrieder of the Free University of Bozen-Bolzano. According to the Journal Citation Reports, the journal has a 2025 impact factor of 5.6.
