= Wenquan Che =

Chinese microwave engineer

Wenquan (Cherry) Che (Chinese: 車文荃) is a Chinese microwave engineer focusing on microwave antennas, monolithic microwave integrated circuits, and medical applications of microwave technology. She is a professor at the South China University of Technology, and a deputy in the National People's Congress.

== Education and career ==
Che graduated from the East China University of Science and Technology in 1990. After a 1995 master's degree from the Nanjing University of Science and Technology (NUST), she completed a Ph.D. in 2003 at the City University of Hong Kong.

After short-term and visiting positions at Polytechnique Montréal in Canada, City University of Hong Kong, and the Technical University of Munich in Germany, she returned to NUST as a faculty member in 2008. She became Executive Dean of the College of Elite Education at NUST in 2013. She moved to her present position at the South China University of Technology in 2018.

From 2019 to 2025, she was editor-in-chief of the journal Microwave and Optical Technology Letters.

== Recognition ==
Che was elected as an IEEE Fellow, in the 2022 class of fellows, "for contributions to planar transmission line structures for microwave passive components".

She is a 2024 recipient of the Outstanding Alumni Award of the City University of Hong Kong Department of Electrical Engineering.
