= Inelastic collision =

Collision in which energy is lost to heat

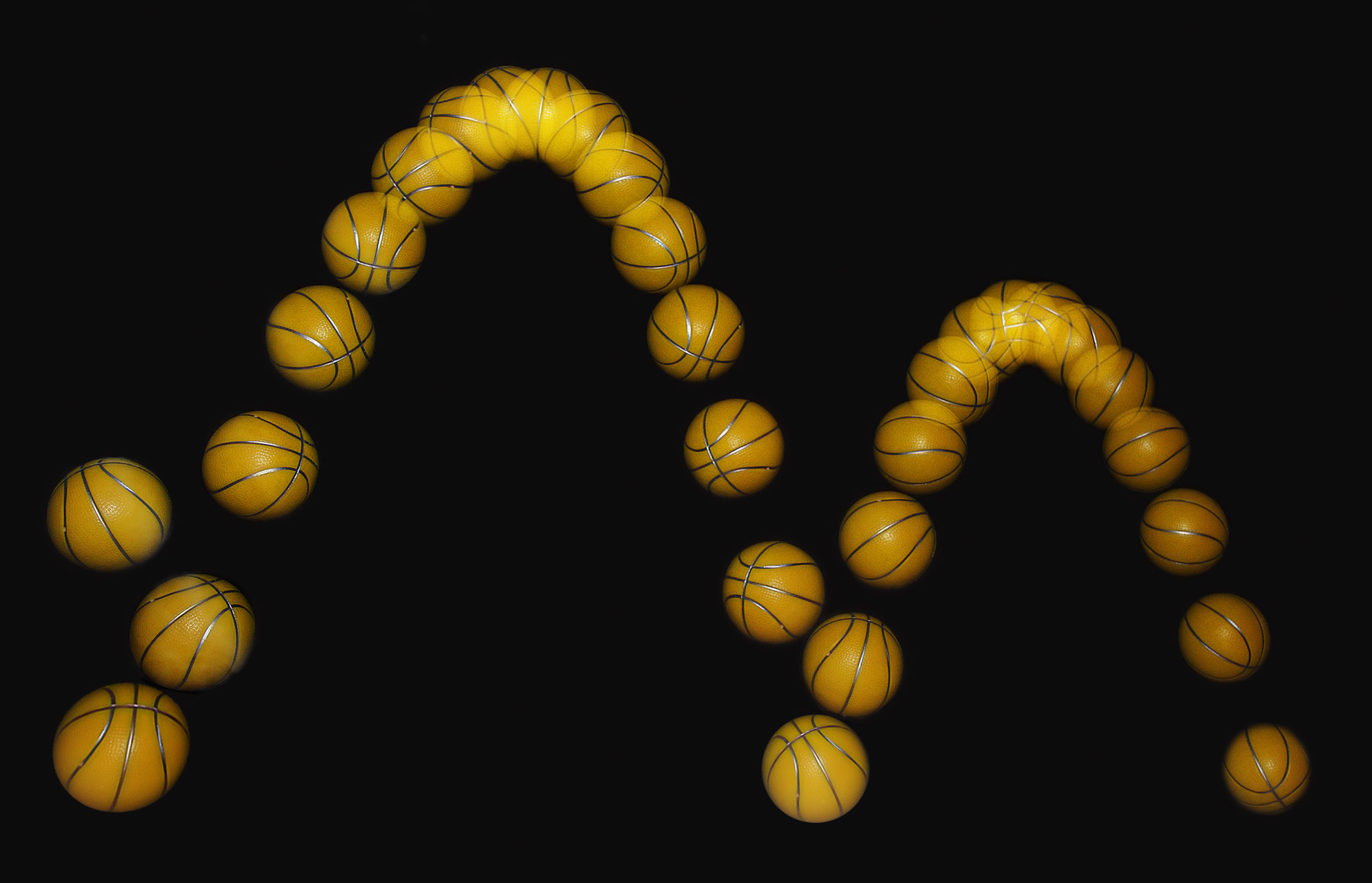
A bouncing ball captured with a stroboscopic flash at 25 images per second. Each impact of the ball is inelastic, meaning that energy dissipates at each bounce. Ignoring air resistance, the square root of the ratio of the height of one bounce to that of the preceding bounce gives the coefficient of restitution for the ball/surface impact.

An inelastic collision, in contrast to an elastic collision, is a collision in which kinetic energy is not conserved due to the action of internal friction.

In collisions of macroscopic bodies, some kinetic energy is turned into vibrational energy of the atoms, causing a heating effect, and the bodies are deformed.

The molecules of a gas or liquid rarely experience perfectly elastic collisions because kinetic energy is exchanged between the molecules' translational motion and their internal degrees of freedom with each collision. At any one instant, half the collisions are – to a varying extent – inelastic (the pair possesses less kinetic energy after the collision than before), and half could be described as “super-elastic” (possessing more kinetic energy after the collision than before). Averaged across an entire sample, molecular collisions are elastic.

Although inelastic collisions do not conserve kinetic energy, they do obey conservation of momentum. Simple ballistic pendulum problems obey the conservation of kinetic energy only when the block swings to its largest angle.

In nuclear physics, an inelastic collision is one in which the incoming particle causes the nucleus it strikes to become excited or to break up. Deep inelastic scattering is a method of probing the structure of subatomic particles in much the same way as Rutherford probed the inside of the atom (see Rutherford scattering). Such experiments were performed on protons in the late 1960s using high-energy electrons at the Stanford Linear Accelerator (SLAC). As in Rutherford scattering, deep inelastic scattering of electrons by proton targets revealed that most of the incident electrons interact very little and pass straight through, with only a small number bouncing back. This indicates that the charge in the proton is concentrated in small lumps, reminiscent of Rutherford's discovery that the positive charge in an atom is concentrated at the nucleus. However, in the case of the proton, the evidence suggested three distinct concentrations of charge (quarks) and not one.

== Formula ==
The formula for the velocities after a one-dimensional collision is:
$$\begin{align}
v_a &= \frac{C_R m_b (u_b - u_a) + m_a u_a + m_b u_b} {m_a+m_b} \\
v_b &= \frac{C_R m_a (u_a - u_b) + m_a u_a + m_b u_b} {m_a+m_b}
\end{align}$$

where

- v_{a} is the final velocity of the first object after impact
- v_{b} is the final velocity of the second object after impact
- u_{a} is the initial velocity of the first object before impact
- u_{b} is the initial velocity of the second object before impact
- m_{a} is the mass of the first object
- m_{b} is the mass of the second object
- C_{R} is the coefficient of restitution; if it is 1 we have an elastic collision; if it is 0 we have a perfectly inelastic collision, see below.

In a center of momentum frame the formulas reduce to:

$$\begin{align}
v_a &= -C_R u_a \\
v_b &= -C_R u_b
\end{align}$$

For two- and three-dimensional collisions the velocities in these formulas are the components perpendicular to the tangent line/plane at the point of contact.

If assuming the objects are not rotating before or after the collision, the normal impulse is:

$$J_{n} = \frac{m_{a} m_{b}}{m_{a} + m_{b}} (1 + C_R) (\vec{u_{b}} - \vec{u_{a}}) \cdot \vec{n}$$

where $\vec{n}$ is the normal vector.

Assuming no friction, this gives the velocity updates:

$$\begin{align}
\Delta \vec{v_{a}} &= \frac{J_{n}}{m_{a}} \vec{n} \\
\Delta \vec{v_{b}} &= -\frac{J_{n}}{m_{b}} \vec{n}
\end{align}$$

== Perfectly inelastic collision ==
A completely inelastic collision between equal masses

A perfectly inelastic collision occurs when the maximum amount of kinetic energy of a system is lost. In a perfectly inelastic collision, i.e., a zero coefficient of restitution, the colliding particles stick together. In such a collision, kinetic energy is lost by bonding the two bodies together. This bonding energy usually results in a maximum kinetic energy loss of the system. It is necessary to consider conservation of momentum: (Note: In the sliding block example above, momentum of the two body system is only conserved if the surface has zero friction. With friction, momentum of the two bodies is transferred to the surface that the two bodies are sliding upon. Similarly, if there is air resistance, the momentum of the bodies can be transferred to the air.) The equation below holds true for the two-body (Body A, Body B) system collision in the example above. In this example, momentum of the system is conserved because there is no friction between the sliding bodies and the surface.
$$m_a u_a + m_b u_b = \left( m_a + m_b \right)  v$$
where v is the final velocity, which is hence given by
$$v=\frac{m_a u_a + m_b  u_b}{m_a + m_b}$$
The reduction of total kinetic energy is equal to the total kinetic energy before the collision in a center of momentum frame with respect to the system of two particles, because in such a frame the kinetic energy after the collision is zero. In this frame most of the kinetic energy before the collision is that of the particle with the smaller mass. In another frame, in addition to the reduction of kinetic energy there may be a transfer of kinetic energy from one particle to the other; the fact that this depends on the frame shows how relative this is. The change in kinetic energy is hence:
$$\Delta KE = {1\over 2}\mu u^2_{\rm rel} = \frac{1}{2}\frac{m_a m_b}{m_a + m_b}|u_a - u_b|^2$$

where μ is the reduced mass and u_{rel} is the relative velocity of the bodies before collision. With time reversed we have the situation of two objects pushed away from each other, e.g. shooting a projectile, or a rocket applying thrust (compare the derivation of the Tsiolkovsky rocket equation).

== Partially inelastic collisions ==
Partially inelastic collisions are the most common type of collisions in the real world (except for elementary particles). In partially inelastic collisions, the objects involved in the collisions do not stick, but some kinetic energy is still lost. Friction, sound and heat are some ways that kinetic energy can be lost in partially inelastic collisions.

== See also ==
- Collision
- Elastic collision
- Coefficient of restitution
