= Collision =

In physics, two bodies contacting each other

A 3D simulation demonstrating a collision with a ball knocking over a bunch of blocks

In physics, a collision is any event in which two or more bodies exert forces on each other in a relatively short time. Although the most common use of the word collision refers to incidents in which two or more objects collide with great force, the scientific use of the term implies nothing about the magnitude of the force.

== Types of collisions ==
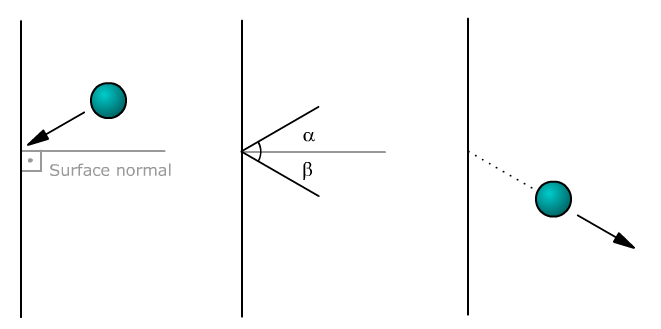
Deflection happens when an object hits a plane surface. If the kinetic energy after impact is the same as before impact, it is an elastic collision. If kinetic energy is lost, it is an inelastic collision. The diagram does not show whether the illustrated collision was elastic or inelastic, because no velocities are provided. The most one can say is that the collision was not perfectly inelastic, because in that case the ball would have stuck to the wall.

Collision is short-duration interaction between two or more bodies simultaneously, causing change in their velocities due to repelling forces exerted by their interactions. The magnitude of the velocity difference just before impact is called the closing speed. All collisions conserve the total momentum of the colliding objects. What distinguishes different types of collisions is whether they also conserve kinetic energy of the system before and after the collision. Collisions are of two types:

1. Elastic collision If all of the total kinetic energy is conserved (i.e. no energy is released as sound, heat, etc.), the collision is said to be perfectly elastic. Such a system is an idealization and cannot occur in reality, due to the second law of thermodynamics.
2. Inelastic collision. If most or all of the total kinetic energy is lost (dissipated as heat, sound, etc. or absorbed by the objects themselves), the collision is said to be inelastic; such collisions involve objects coming to a full stop. An example of this is a baseball bat hitting a baseball - the kinetic energy of the bat is transferred to the ball, greatly increasing the ball's velocity. The sound of the bat hitting the ball represents the loss of energy. A "perfectly inelastic" collision (also called a "perfectly plastic" collision) is a limiting case of inelastic collision in which the two bodies coalesce after impact. An example of such a collision is a car crash, as cars crumple inward when crashing, rather than bouncing off of each other. This is by design, for the safety of the occupants and bystanders should a crash occur - the frame of the car absorbs the energy of the crash instead.

The degree to which a collision is elastic or inelastic is quantified by the coefficient of restitution, a value that generally ranges between zero and one. A perfectly elastic collision has a coefficient of restitution of one; a perfectly inelastic collision has a coefficient of restitution of zero. The line of impact is the line that is collinear to the common normal of the surfaces that are closest or in contact during impact. This is the line along which internal force of collision acts during impact, and Newton's coefficient of restitution is defined only along this line.

Collisions in ideal gases approach perfectly elastic collisions, as do scattering interactions of sub-atomic particles which are deflected by the electromagnetic force. Some large-scale interactions like the slingshot type gravitational interactions between satellites and planets are almost perfectly elastic.

== Examples ==
=== Billiards ===
Collisions play an important role in cue sports. Because the collisions between billiard balls are nearly elastic, and the balls roll on a surface that produces low rolling friction, their behavior is often used to illustrate Newton's laws of motion. After a zero-friction collision of a moving ball with a stationary one of equal mass, the angle between the directions of the two balls is 90 degrees. This is an important fact that professional billiards players take into account, although it assumes the ball is moving without any impact of friction across the table rather than rolling with friction. Consider an elastic collision in two dimensions of any two masses m_{a} and m_{b}, with respective initial velocities v_{a1} and v_{b1} where v_{b1} = 0, and final velocities v_{a2} and v_{b2}. Conservation of momentum gives m_{a}v_{a1} = m_{a}v_{a2} + m_{b}v_{b2}. Conservation of energy for an elastic collision gives (1/2)m_{a}|v_{a1}|^{2} = (1/2)m_{a}|v_{a2}|^{2} + (1/2)m_{b}|v_{b2}|^{2}. Now consider the case m_{a} = m_{b}: we obtain v_{a1} = v_{a2} + v_{b2} and |v_{a1}|^{2} = |v_{a2}|^{2} + |v_{b2}|^{2}. Taking the dot product of each side of the former equation with itself, |v_{a1}|^{2} = v_{a1}•v_{a1} = |v_{a2}|^{2} + |v_{b2}|^{2} + 2v_{a2}•v_{b2}. Comparing this with the latter equation gives v_{a2}•v_{b2} = 0, so they are perpendicular unless v_{a2} is the zero vector (which occurs if and only if the collision is head-on).

=== Perfect inelastic collision ===

In a perfect inelastic collision, i.e., a zero coefficient of restitution, the colliding particles coalesce. Using conservation of momentum:

$$m_a \mathbf v_{a1} + m_b \mathbf v_{b1} = \left( m_a + m_b \right) \mathbf v_2,$$

the final velocity is given by

$$\mathbf v_2 = \frac{m_a \mathbf v_{a1} + m_b \mathbf v_{b1}}{m_a + m_b}.$$

The reduction of total kinetic energy is equal to the total kinetic energy before the collision in a center of momentum frame with respect to the system of two particles, because in such a frame the kinetic energy after the collision is zero. In this frame most of the kinetic energy before the collision is that of the particle with the smaller mass. In another frame, in addition to the reduction of kinetic energy there may be a transfer of kinetic energy from one particle to the other; the fact that this depends on the frame shows how relative this is. With time reversed we have the situation of two objects pushed away from each other, e.g. shooting a projectile, or a rocket applying thrust (compare the derivation of the Tsiolkovsky rocket equation).

=== Animal locomotion ===
Collisions of an animal's foot or paw with the underlying substrate are generally termed ground reaction forces. These collisions are inelastic, as kinetic energy is not conserved. An important research topic in prosthetics is quantifying the forces generated during the foot-ground collisions associated with both disabled and non-disabled gait. This quantification typically requires subjects to walk across a force platform (sometimes called a "force plate") as well as detailed kinematic and dynamic (sometimes termed kinetic) analysis.

=== Hypervelocity impacts ===
Video of the hypervelocity impact of NASA’s Deep Impact probe on comet Tempel 1.

Hypervelocity is very high velocity, approximately over 3,000 meters per second (11,000 km/h, 6,700 mph, 10,000 ft/s, or Mach 8.8). In particular, hypervelocity is velocity so high that the strength of materials upon impact is very small compared to inertial stresses. Thus, metals and fluids behave alike under hypervelocity impact. An impact under extreme hypervelocity results in vaporization of the impactor and target. For structural metals, hypervelocity is generally considered to be over 2,500 m/s (5,600 mph, 9,000 km/h, 8,200 ft/s, or Mach 7.3). Meteorite craters are also examples of hypervelocity impacts.

== See also ==
- Ballistic pendulum
- Coefficient of restitution
- Collision detection
- Contact mechanics
- Elastic collision
- Friction
- Impact crater
- Impact event
- Inelastic collision
- Kinetic theory of gases - collisions between molecules
- Projectile
- Coulomb collision
