= Benjamin Robins =

British scientist (1707–1751)

Benjamin Robins (1707 – 29 July 1751) was a pioneering British scientist, Newtonian mathematician, and military engineer.

He wrote an influential treatise on gunnery, for the first time introducing Newtonian science to military men, was an early enthusiast for rifled gun barrels, and his work had substantive influence on the development of artillery during the latter half of the eighteenth century – and directly stimulated the teaching of calculus in military academies.

== Early life ==
Benjamin Robins was born in Bath. His parents were Quakers in poor circumstances, and as a result, he received very little formal education. Having come to London on the advice of Dr. Henry Pemberton (1694–1771), who had recognised Robins's talents, for a time he maintained himself by teaching mathematics, but soon devoted himself to engineering and the study of fortification.

== Scientific gunnery ==
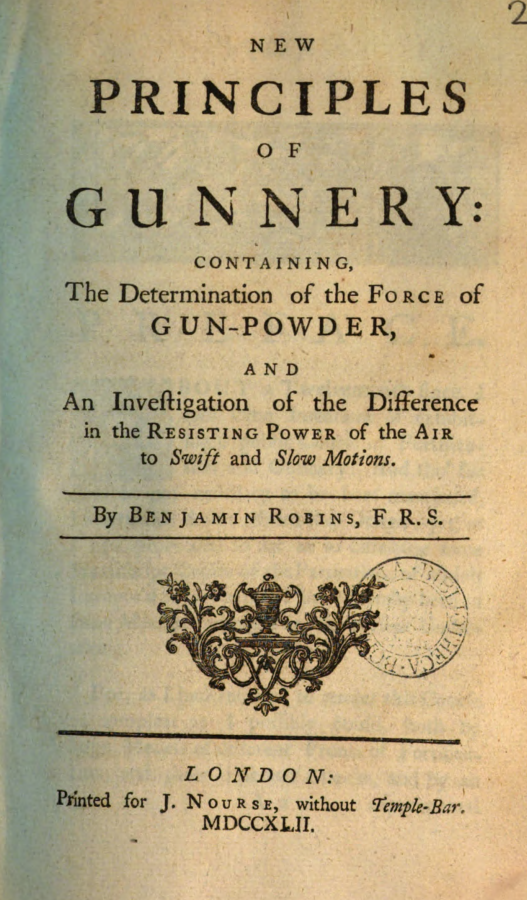

In particular he carried out an extensive series of experiments in gunnery, embodying his results in his famous treatise on New Principles of Gunnery (1742), which contains a description of his ballistic pendulum (see chronograph).

Robins also made a number of important experiments on the resistance of the air to the motion of projectiles, and on the force of gunpowder, with computation of the velocities thereby communicated to projectiles. He compared the results of his theory with experimental determinations of the ranges of mortars and cannon, and gave practical maxims for the management of artillery. He also made observations on the flight of rockets, and wrote on the advantages of rifled gun barrels. His work on gunnery was translated into German by Leonhard Euler, who added a critical commentary of his own. However, the work of Robins still served as an important source of technical information that helped the later advancement of the Prussian artillery under Frederick the Great.

== Mathematics ==
Of less interest nowadays are Robins's more purely mathematical writings, such as his Discourse concerning the Nature and Certainty of Sir Isaac Newton's Methods of Fluxions and of Prime and Ultimate Ratios (1735), A Demonstration of the Eleventh Proposition of Sir Isaac Newton's Treatise of Quadratures (Phil. Trans., 1727), and similar works.

== Politics ==
Besides his scientific labours, Robins took an active part in politics. He wrote pamphlets in support of the opposition to Sir Robert Walpole, and was secretary of a committee appointed by the House of Commons to enquire into the conduct of that minister. He also wrote a preface to the Report on the Proceedings of the Board of General Officers on their Examination into the Conduct of Lieutenant-General Sir John Cope, in which he gave an apology for the battle of Prestonpans.

In 1749, he was appointed engineer general to the East India Company, and went out to superintend the reconstruction of their forts. However, his health soon failed, and he died at Fort St David in India. His works were published in two volumes in 1761.

== Sources ==
- Lee, Sidney, ed. (1896). "Robins, Benjamin" . Dictionary of National Biography. Vol. 48. London: Smith, Elder & Co.
- Steele, Brett D. "Robins, Benjamin (1707–1751)". Oxford Dictionary of National Biography (online ed.). Oxford University Press. doi:10.1093/ref:odnb/23823. (Subscription, Wikipedia Library access or UK public library membership required.)
- O'Connor, John J.; Robertson, Edmund F., "Benjamin Robins", MacTutor History of Mathematics Archive, University of St Andrews
