= Gun chronograph =

Tool used to measure projectile speed

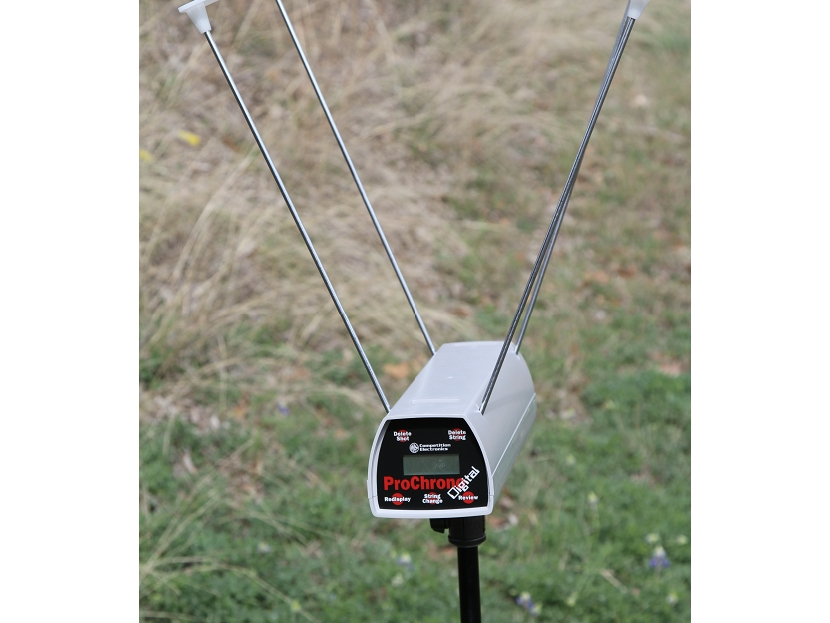
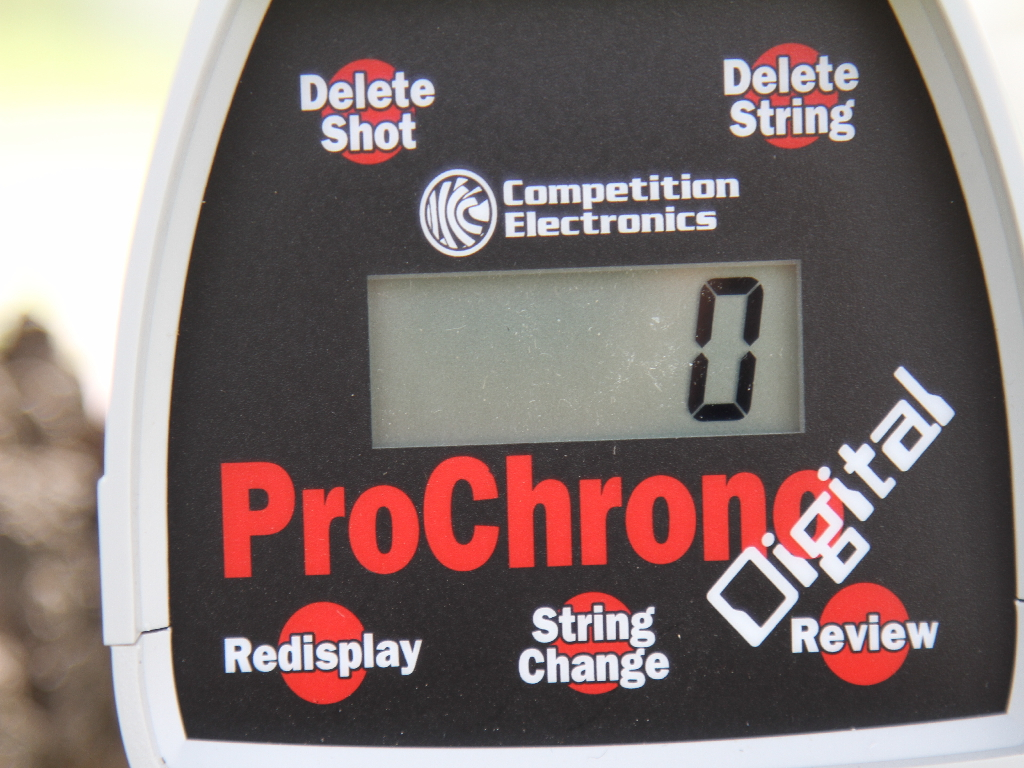
A Down Range chronograph with storage and statistical tools.

A ballistic chronograph or gun chronograph is a measuring instrument used to measure the velocity of a projectile in flight, typically fired from a gun or other firearm. The instrument is often useful for tasks such as gauging the utility of a firearm or safety of less-lethal projectiles fired from items such as a paintball gun or BB gun.

== History ==
Benjamin Robins (1707–1751) invented the ballistic pendulum that measures the momentum of the projectile fired by a gun. Dividing the momentum by the projectile mass gives the velocity. Robbins published his results as New Principles of Gunnery in 1742. The ballistic pendulum could make only one measurement per firing because the device catches the projectile. The gun's accuracy also limited how far down range a measurement could be made.

Alessandro Vittorio Papacino d'Antoni published results in 1765 using a wheel chronometer. This used a horizontal spinning wheel with a vertical paper mounted on the rim. The bullet was fired across the diameter of the wheel so that it pierced the paper on both sides, and the angular difference along with the rotation speed of the wheel was used to compute the bullet velocity.

An early chronograph that measures velocity directly was built in 1804 by Grobert, a colonel in the French Army. This used a rapidly rotating axle with two disks mounted on it about 13 feet apart. The bullet was fired parallel to the axle, and the angular displacement of the holes in the two disks, together with the rotational speed of the axle, yielded the bullet velocity.

Ingalls (1886, p. 18) describes Bashforth's chronograph that could make many measurements over long distances:

In 1865 the Rev. Francis Bashforth, M. A., who had then been recently appointed Professor of Applied Mathematics to the advanced class of artillery officers at Woolwich, began a series of experiments for determining the resistance of the air to the motion of both spherical and oblong projectiles, which he continued from time to time until 1880. As the instruments then in use for measuring velocities were incapable of giving the times occupied by a shot in passing over a series of successive equal spaces, he began his labors by inventing and constructing a chronograph to accomplish this object, which was tried late in 1865 in Woolwich Marshes, with ten screens, and with perfect success.

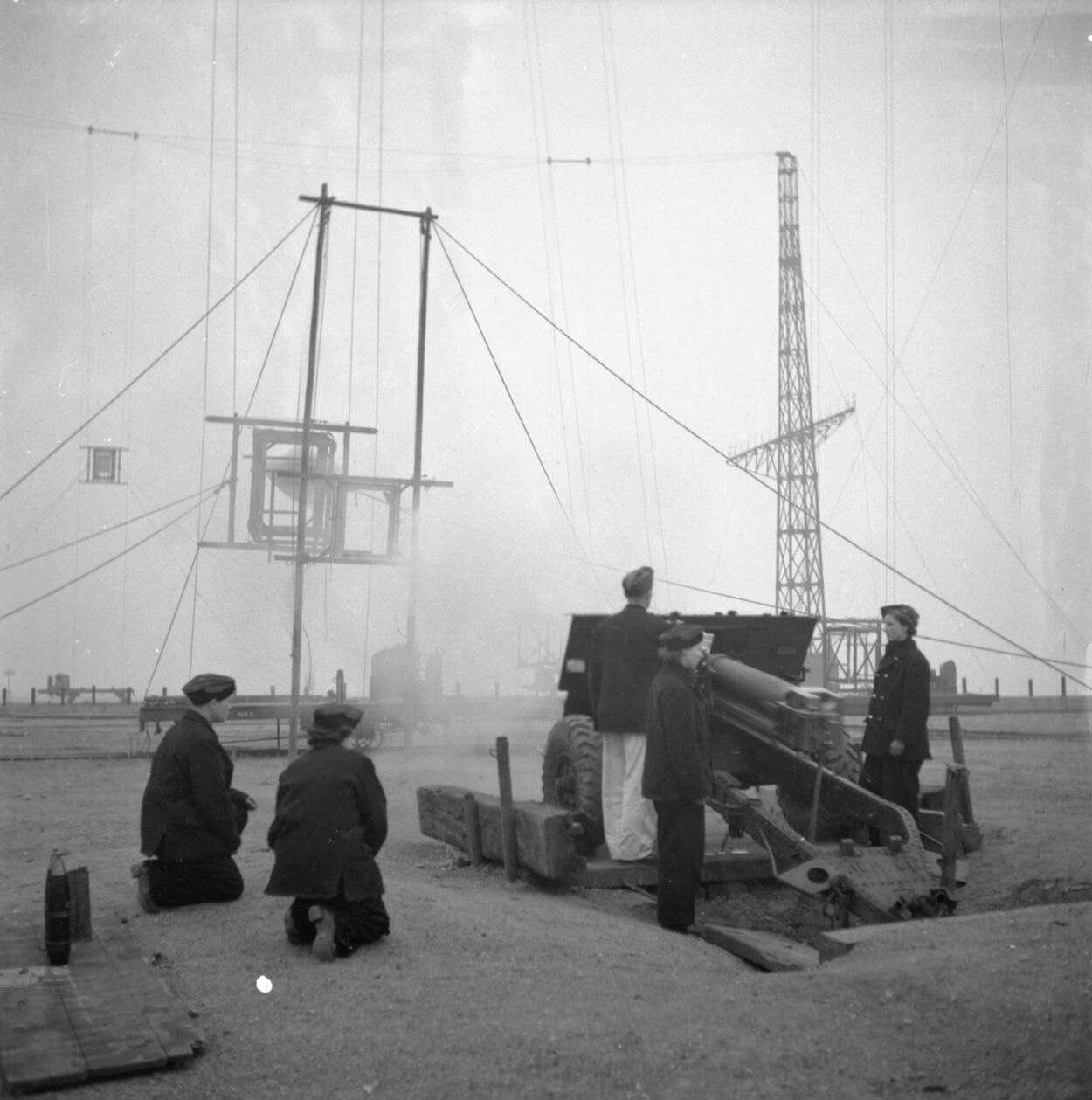
The velocity of Ordnance QF 25-pounder shells being measured in the United Kingdom, 1943

The Bashforth screens were made with several threads and series connected switches. A projectile passing through a screen would break one or more threads, the broken thread caused a switch to momentarily (about 20 ms) interrupt a current as the switch arm moved from its weighted position to its unweighted position, and the momentary interruption would be recorded on a paper chart.

The first electronic ballistic chronograph was invented by Kiryako ("Jerry") Arvanetakis in the 1950s. As a consulting engineer under contract by NACA (later NASA), he was asked to find a way to accurately measure the velocity of various projectiles fired at hyper-velocities into a variety of engineered materials in anticipation of crewed space flight. His first design was an open rectangular frame of square aluminum tubing with a screen of fine copper wire at both ends. Breaking the first wire started charging a capacitor, breaking the second wire stopped it. Measuring the accumulated voltage and knowing the rate of charge the elapsed time could be accurately calculated.

== Modern chronograph ==
The modern chronograph consists of two sensing areas framed by rods topped by diffusing screens or artificial lighting above (or below) along with optical sensors that detect the passage of the bullet. The time it takes the bullet to travel the distance between the sensors is measured electronically from which velocity is calculated and displayed.

Advanced ballistic chronographs include a type employing Doppler radar to measure bullets in free flight at various distances; another is a device mounted at the end of a barrel, which uses magnetic field sensors for the measurement of a bullet's velocity as it exits the muzzle.

== See also ==
- Aberdeen chronograph
