= Grobert =

Grobert is a surname. Notable people with the surname include:

- Helen Grobert (born 1992), German cross-country cyclist
- Nicole Grobert, British-German materials chemist

== See also ==
- Gobert
- Robert
