= List of educational institutions in the Kolkata metropolitan area =

This is a list of educational institutions in the Kolkata metropolitan area, West Bengal, India.

== Universities ==
=== Public universities ===
University	Established	Location	Type
University of Calcutta	1857	College Street	State university
Jadavpur University	1955	Jadavpur	State university
Presidency University	1817	College Street	State university
Rabindra Bharati University	1962	Jorasanko	State university
Netaji Subhas Open University	1997	Bidhannagar	State open university
MAKAUT	2001	New Town	State university
Sanskrit College and University	1824	College Street	State university
Aliah University	2008	New Town	State university
West Bengal University of Health Sciences	2003	Bidhannagar	State university
West Bengal University of Animal and Fishery Sciences	1995	Belgachia	State university
West Bengal National University of Juridical Sciences	1999	Bidhannagar	State university
Baba Saheb Ambedkar Education University	2015	Ballygunge	State university

=== Private universities ===
University	Established	Location	Type
Techno India University	2012	New Town	Private university
JIS University	2014	Agarpara	Private university
Amity University, Kolkata	2015	New Town	Private university
Sister Nivedita University	2017	New Town	Private university
St. Xavier's University, Kolkata	2017	New Town	Private university
UEM Kolkata	2014	New Town	Private university
Swami Vivekananda University	2019	Barrackpore	Private university
Brainware University	2016	Barasat	Private university
The Neotia University	2015	Sarisha	Private university

=== Central and national institutions ===
Institution	Established	Location	Institutional type
Indian Statistical Institute	1931	Baranagar	Institute of national importance
Indian Maritime University	2008	Alipore	Central university
National Institute of Fashion Technology	1986	Bidhannagar	Institute of national importance

== Colleges ==
=== General degree colleges ===
College	Established	Location	Affiliation
Scottish Church College	1830	Hedua	University of Calcutta
St. Xavier's College, Kolkata	1860	College Street	University of Calcutta
Bethune College	1879	Bidhannagar Road	University of Calcutta
Surendranath College	1884	Sealdah	University of Calcutta
City College, Kolkata	1879	Amherst Street	University of Calcutta
Maulana Azad College	1926	Rafi Ahmed Kidwai Road	University of Calcutta
Bangabasi College	1887	Sealdah	University of Calcutta
Asutosh College	1916	Ballygunge	University of Calcutta
Heramba Chandra College	1896	Ballygunge	University of Calcutta
Acharya Jagadish Chandra Bose College	1968	Ballygunge	University of Calcutta
Goenka College of Commerce and Business Administration	1905	Burrabazar	University of Calcutta
Sivanath Sastri College	1955	Ballygunge	University of Calcutta

=== Women's colleges ===
College	Established	Location	Affiliation
Bethune College	1879	Bidhannagar Road	University of Calcutta
Lady Brabourne College	1939	Park Circus	University of Calcutta
Jogamaya Devi College	1932	Jadavpur	University of Calcutta
Loreto College, Kolkata	1912	Park Street	University of Calcutta

== Medical colleges and institutions ==
Institution	Established	Location	Type/Ownership
Medical College and Hospital, Kolkata	1835	College Street	Government of West Bengal
IPGMER and SSKM Hospital	1707	Bhowanipore	Government of West Bengal
Nil Ratan Sircar Medical College and Hospital	1882	Sealdah	Government of West Bengal
Calcutta National Medical College	1948	Beniapukur	Government of West Bengal
R. G. Kar Medical College and Hospital	1886	Shyambazar	Government of West Bengal
College of Medicine & Sagore Dutta Hospital	2010	Kamarhati	Government of West Bengal
ESI-PGIMSR & ESIC Medical College and Hospital	2013	Joka	Government of India
Calcutta School of Tropical Medicine	1914	Chittaranjan Avenue	Government of West Bengal
College of Medicine & JNM Hospital	2009	Kalyani	Government of West Bengal
All India Institute of Hygiene and Public Health	1932	Chittaranjan Avenue	Government of India
All India Institute of Medical Sciences	2019	Kalyani	Government of India
Institute of Child Health	1956	Ballygunge	Private
KPC Medical College and Hospital	2006	Jadavpur	Private
Vivekananda Institute of Medical Sciences	1932	Sarat Bose Road	Private
JIS School of Medical Science & Research	2023	Santragachi	Private
Jagannath Gupta Institute of Medical Sciences & Hospital	2018	Budge Budge	Private
Jagannath Gupta Institute of Medical Sciences & Hospital	2025	Karnamadhabpur	Private

== Dental colleges ==
Institution	Established	Location	Type
Dr. R. Ahmed Dental College and Hospital	1920	Sealdah	Government dental college
Guru Nanak Institute of Dental Science and Research	2003	Panihati	Private

== Engineering and technology ==
Institution	Established	Location	Type
Jadavpur University	1955	Jadavpur	Public university
Indian Statistical Institute	1931	Baranagar	Institute of national importance
IIEST Shibpur	1856	Shibpur	Institute of national importance
Heritage Institute of Technology	2001	Anandapur	Private engineering college
Techno India	2001	Salt Lake	Private engineering institution

== Law ==
Institution	Established	Location	Type
West Bengal National University of Juridical Sciences	1999	Bidhannagar	National law university
Department of Law, University of Calcutta	1909	Hazra	University department
Jogesh Chandra Chaudhuri Law College	1950	Ballygunge	Law college

== Management and business ==
Institution	Established	Location	Type
Indian Institute of Management Calcutta	1961	Joka	Institute of national importance
Indian Institute of Social Welfare and Business Management	1953	College Square	Management institute
Goenka College of Commerce and Business Administration	1905	Burrabazar	Commerce college
St. Xavier's College, Kolkata	1860	College Street	Autonomous college

== Research institutions ==
Institution	Established	Location	Type
Indian Statistical Institute	1931	Baranagar	Institute of national importance
Bose Institute	1917	Bidhannagar	Research institute
Saha Institute of Nuclear Physics	1949	Bidhannagar	Research institute
Indian Association for the Cultivation of Science	1876	Jadavpur	Research institute
Variable Energy Cyclotron Centre	1977	Bidhannagar	Government research centre

== Architecture and design ==
Institution	Established	Location	Type
IIEST Shibpur	1856	Shibpur	Public institution
National Institute of Fashion Technology	1986	Bidhannagar	National institute

== Schools ==
=== Notable schools ===
School	Established	Location	Type
Hindu School	1817	College Street	Government school
La Martinière Calcutta	1836	Minto Park	Private school
Hare School	1818	College Street	Government school
St. James' School	1864	A.J.C. Bose Road	Private school
St. Xavier's Collegiate School	1860	Park Street	Private school
Don Bosco School	1958	Park Circus	Private school
South Point High School	1954	Ballygunge	Private school
Loreto House	1842	Park Street	Girls private school

== Open and distance education ==
- Netaji Subhas Open University

== Specialized institutions ==
=== Fine arts and performing arts ===
- Rabindra Bharati University
- Government College of Art & Craft, Kolkata
- Indian Museum educational programmes

=== Maritime education ===
- Indian Maritime University Kolkata
- Marine Engineering and Research Institute

=== Fashion and design ===
- National Institute of Fashion Technology, Kolkata

== See also ==
- Education in West Bengal
- Education in Kolkata
- List of universities in West Bengal
- List of colleges affiliated to the University of Calcutta
- List of schools in Kolkata
- Kolkata metropolitan area
