= Dhrubajyoti Chattopadhyay =

Indian biochemist and academic administrator

- Education: Presidency College, Kolkata; University of Calcutta; Bose Institute
- Known for: Research in biochemistry and academic administration
- Scientific career
- Fields: Biochemistry
- Workplaces: University of Calcutta; Amity University Kolkata; Sister Nivedita University

Dhrubajyoti Chattopadhyay (1954) is an Indian biochemist and academic administrator. He has served as the Vice-Chancellor of Sister Nivedita University in Kolkata since January 2020. He previously served as the founding Vice-Chancellor of Amity University Kolkata from 2015 to 2019, the Dean of the Faculty of Science and Pro-Vice-Chancellor of the University of Calcutta and as the Director at the Centre for Research in Nano Science and Nano Technology at the University from 2007 till 2015.

== Early life and education ==
Chattopadhyay obtained his Bachelor of Science degree in Chemistry from Presidency College, Kolkata. He later completed a Master of Science degree in Biochemistry at the University of Calcutta. He received his PhD in Biochemistry from the Bose Institute, Kolkata.

== Academic career ==
Chattopadhyay began his teaching career in 1981 as a lecturer in the Department of Chemistry at Jogamaya Devi College in Kolkata. In 1983 he joined the Department of Biochemistry at the University of Calcutta as a lecturer. In 1997 he became the Guha Professor at the Dr. B. C. Guha Centre for Genetic Engineering and Biotechnology at the University of Calcutta.

During his tenure at the university, he served as the Dean of the Faculty of Science (2003–2007), Director of the Centre for Research in Nanoscience and Nanotechnology (2007–2015) and Pro-Vice-Chancellor (2008–2015). In 2015 he was appointed the founding Vice-Chancellor of Amity University Kolkata. Since January 2020 he has served as the Vice-Chancellor of Sister Nivedita University in Kolkata.

Chattopadhyay's research work focuses on molecular biology, biochemistry, and biotechnology. He has received several academic recognitions. He is the elected Fellow of the National Academy of Sciences, India, Fellow of the Indian Academy of Sciences, Fellow of the West Bengal Academy of Science and Technology. He also received the UNESCO–IUMS MIRCEN-SGM fellowship to carry out research at the University of Texas.
