= Education in Kolkata =

The systems of secondary and post-secondary education in Kolkata are listed as follows:

== Schooling ==
Kolkata has several parallel systems of school education, and K-12 schools are usually affiliated with either of the following:

Name of affiliating organization	Type of organization	Year of establishment
Cambridge International Examinations	International school board	1998
Central Board of Secondary Education	Central government administered school board	1962
Council for the Indian School Certificate Examinations	Non-governmental school board	1958
Edexcel	International school board	1996
International Baccalaureate	International school board	1968
National Institute of Open Schooling	Central government administered open school board	1989
West Bengal Board of Madrasah Education	State government administered Islamic madrasah and school board	1927
West Bengal Board of Secondary Education	State government administered school board	1951
West Bengal Council of Higher Secondary Education	State government administered school board	1975
West Bengal Council of Rabindra Open Schooling	State government administered open school board	2001
West Bengal State Council of Vocational Education and Training	State government administered vocational school board	2005

In addition to these, private candidates can appear for examinations of either the CBSE, West Bengal boards and other state boards which conduct their courses in the city.

Non-privileged children mainly attend government primary schools, if they attend school at all. The quality of education available in these schools is not, by world standards, good. There have been recent initiatives, such as Shikhshalaya Prakalpa, to bring more children into the school system and improve the quality of teaching.

== Universities ==
Kolkata has twenty public universities or autonomous institutions that award their own degrees or diplomas. The following list contains the names of the degree or diploma awarding institutions that have their main campuses in or around Kolkata:

Name of institution	Type of institution	Year of establishment
Aliah University	State government administered non-affiliating multidisciplinary Islamic university	1781, as Calcutta Madrasah College; 2007, as Aliah University
Amity University Kolkata	Private university	2015
Indian Institute of Engineering Science and Technology, Shibpur	Central government administered engineering university	1856, as Calcutta Civil Engineering College; 2014, as IIEST
Indian Institute of Foreign Trade	Central government administered autonomous institution for research and education in foreign trade	2006
Indian Institute of Management Calcutta	Central government administered autonomous business school	1961
Indian Institute of Science Education and Research, Kolkata	Central government administered autonomous institution for research and education in science	2006
Indian Statistical Institute	Central government administered autonomous institution for research and education in statistics	1931
Jadavpur University	State government administered non-affiliating and multidisciplinary university	1906, as Bengal Technical Institute; 1956, as JU
JIS University	Private university	2014
Neotia University	Private university	2015
Netaji Subhas Open University	State government administered distance-education oriented, affiliating and multidisciplinary university	1997
Presidency University, Kolkata	State government administered non-affiliating and multidisciplinary university	1817, as Hindu College; 2010, as Presidency University
Rabindra Bharati University	State government administered non-affiliating liberal arts university	1962
Ramakrishna Mission Vivekananda University	Private university	2005
Satyajit Ray Film and Television Institute	Central government administered autonomous film institute	1995
Techno India University	Private university	2012
University of Calcutta	State government administered affiliating and multidisciplinary university	1857
West Bengal National University of Juridical Sciences	State government administered non-affiliating law university	1999
West Bengal University of Animal and Fishery Sciences	State government administered non-affiliating veterinary education university	1893, as Bengal Veterinary College; 1995 as West Bengal University of Animal and Fishery Sciences
West Bengal University of Health Sciences	State government administered affiliating medical education university	2003
West Bengal State University	State government administered affiliating and multidisciplinary university	2008
West Bengal University of Technology	State government administered affiliating and engineering education university	2000
St Xavier's College	Autonomous	1860

== Engineering colleges ==
Three of India's oldest engineering institutions are located in Kolkata namely IIEST, Shibpur, Marine Engineering and Research Institute and Jadavpur University. The University of Calcutta and Jadavpur University have been declared as "university with potential for excellence (UPE)" by the University Grants Commission. Self-aided engineering colleges started to function in the late 1990s. All self-aided engineering colleges of the city are affiliated to the West Bengal University of Technology. Some engineering colleges are funded by the World Bank under the "Technical Education Quality Improvement Program". The University of Calcutta, Aliah University and Techno India University also offer engineering courses. The Indian Institute of Technology Kharagpur, the Birla Institute of Technology, and Jnan Chandra Ghosh Polytechnic also offer technology and related courses in their city based campuses.

== Vocational Schools ==
The Department of Technical Education and Skill Development, Govt of West Bengal leads in providing vocational training. other institutes like JIS University, IHM Kolkata, ISHM provide courses.

== Medical and Dental colleges ==
All colleges are affiliated with the West Bengal University of Health Sciences, Kolkata.

- Calcutta Medical College
- Calcutta National Medical College
- Nil Ratan Sarkar Medical College and Hospital
- R.G.Kar Medical College
- IPGMER and SSKM Hospital
- College of Medicine & Sagore Dutta Hospital
- KPC Medical College and Hospital
- Dr. R. Ahmed Dental College and Hospital
- Guru Nanak Institute of Dental Science and Research

== Institutions of national importance ==
- Indian Institute of Engineering Science and Technology, Shibpur
- Asiatic Society
- Bose Institute
- Indian Statistical Institute
- Indian Institute of Management Calcutta
- Marine Engineering and Research Institute
- Indian Association for the Cultivation of Science
- Indian Institute of Science Education and Research, Kolkata
- Indian Institute of Chemical Biology
- Variable Energy Cyclotron Centre
- Saha Institute of Nuclear Physics
- S.N. Bose National Centre for Basic Sciences
