= Tolani Maritime Institute =

Coordinates: 18°44′08.7″N 73°43′59.8″E

Tolani Maritime Institute Pune
- Motto: Attitude. Skill. Knowledge.
- Type: Private institution
- Established: 1998
- Principal: Dr.Sanjeet Kanungo
- Undergraduates: 1,500
- Location: Talegaon, Pune, Maharashtra, India
- Campus: spread over 100 acres (0.40 km^{2}) in Pune
- Acronym: TMI
- Website: Tolani Maritime Institute

Tolani Maritime Institute also known as TMI is a maritime college in Induri, Pune, Maharashtra, India which was established in 1998. It has about 1,500 students in its campus based and distance learning programmes.

== Departments ==
The major departments

- Nautical science
- Marine engineering
- Pre Sea Training
- ETO Training Course

== Accreditations and affiliations ==
TMI is affiliated with Indian Maritime University and its courses are approved by the Directorate General of Shipping (DGS), which is responsible for maritime administration and for overseeing maritime education and training in India.

TMI is a member of the Association of Maritime Education and Training Institutions in Asia-Pacific (AMETIAP). The goal of AMETIAP, which has over 85 members, consisting of maritime training institutions throughout the Asia-Pacific region, is to foster cross-border co-operation and to improve the quality of maritime training and education.

TMI degree courses are approved by Ministry of Land, Infrastructure, Transport and Tourism (MLIT), Japan.

TMI degree programmes are also approved by the Maritime and Port Authority of Singapore. TMI graduates may, if they so desire, appear for Deck Officer Certificate of Competency / MEO Class 5 Certificate of Competency, after completing a two-week course at Singapore.

TMI has been assigned as ‘Grade 1’ for its degree courses by Crisil.
