= HIMT =

Hindustan Institute of Maritime Training (HIMT)
- Motto: Where Knowledge is Wealth
- Type: Private Institution
- Established: 1998, 27 years ago.
- Founder: Dr. Sanjeev S Vakil
- Parent institution: HIMT Group of Institutes
- Accreditation: ISO 9001 : 2015
- Affiliations: Indian Maritime University (IMU)
- Academic affiliations: DG Shipping, UK MCA
- Total staff: 100+
- Students: 4,51,000+
- Location: Chennai, Tamil Nadu, India; 13.085234°N 80.250439°E
- Campus: 12 acres; Urban
- Website: himtmarine.com

The HIMT Group of Institutes is a maritime education and training institution founded in 1998 in Kilpauk, Chennai, by Dr. Sanjeev S. Vakil. The institute provides pre-sea and post sea courses and regulated by the Directorate General of Shipping (DG Shipping), Government of India. HIMT opened its college at Kalpakkam after getting approval from Kalpakkam nuclear power plant. HIMT is also affiliated with the Indian Maritime University (IMU).

== History ==
Hindustan Institute of Maritime Training (HIMT) was established in 1998 by Dr Sanjeev S. Vakil, a Mechanical Engineering graduate. The institute began by offering post-sea courses.

== Campuses ==
- HIMT College (Pre-Sea Campus), Chennai - Residential campus offering degree, diploma, and certification programmes.
- HIMT Kilpauk, Chennai - Post-sea training centre for STCW and modular courses.
- HIMT Tidal Park, Chennai - Advanced simulator-based post-sea training facility.
- Vizag HIMT, Visakhapatnam - Post-sea training centre serving India’s eastern region.
- HIMT Offshore, Chennai - Training centre offering UK MCA-approved courses.
- HIMT Mock-up, Chennai - Dedicated practical training yard with waterfront access for safety and emergency drills.

== Academics ==
HIMT’s academic structure is broadly divided into:

- Pre-Sea Training - Entry-level programmes for cadets.
- Post-Sea Training – Advanced, refresher, competency-based training, Simulation and Practical Training.
- Value-added Training – Facilities for hands-on and scenario-based training.

== Affiliations ==
- D.G. Shipping, (Govt. of India)
- Indian Maritime University.
- UK Maritime and Coastguard Agency.

== Accreditations ==
HIMT affiliates with national and international maritime bodies, including:

- Approved by the Directorate General of Shipping - DGS (Government of India)
- Affiliated with Indian Maritime University (IMU)
- Approved by UK Maritime and Coastguard Agency (MCA)
