= Asansol Engineering College =

Engineering college of West Bengal

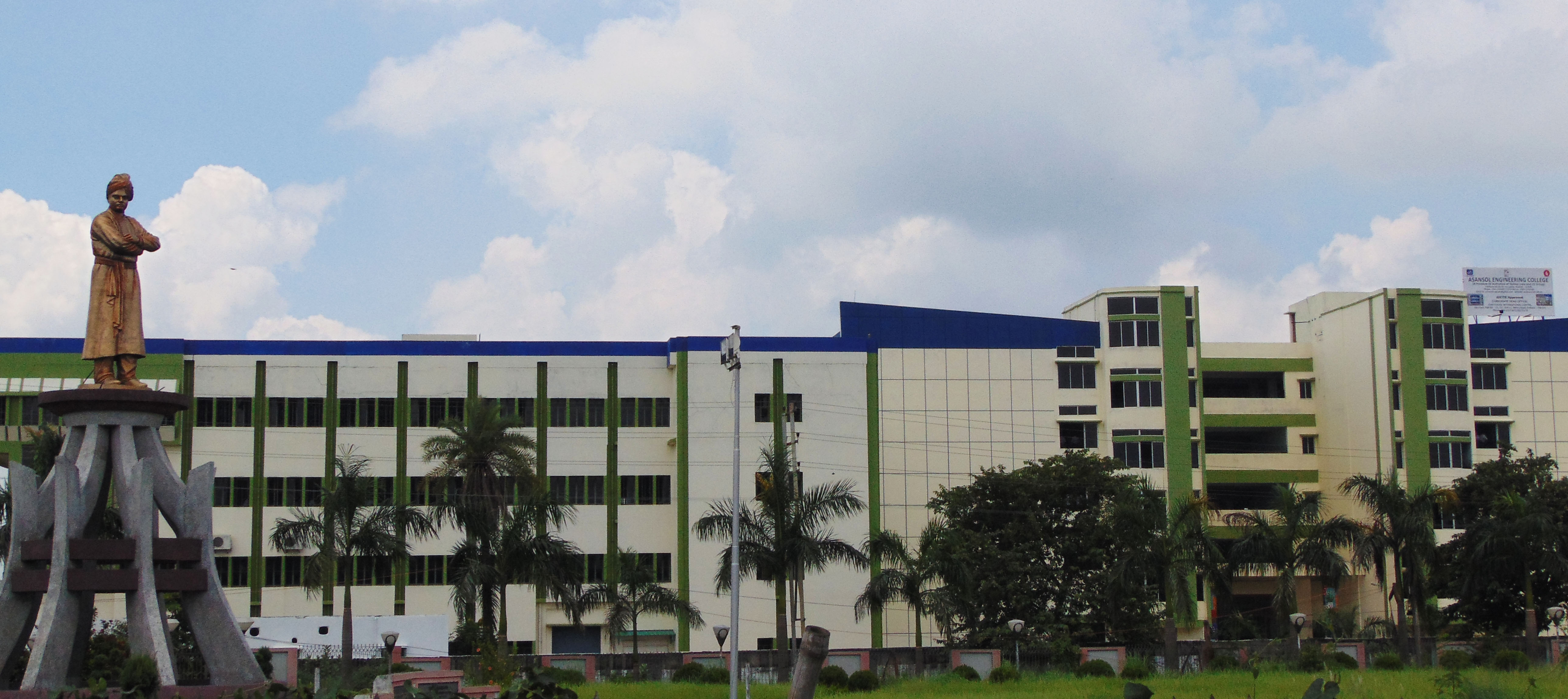
- Other name: AEC
- Motto: Engaging Talent Discovering Ideas
- Type: Private
- Established: 8 August 1998
- Accreditation: NAAC
- Affiliations: Maulana Abul Kalam Azad University of Technology, West Bengal
- Principal: Abhijit Bhowmick; G. S. Panda (Vice-Principal)
- Faculty: 186
- Undergraduates: 1260
- Postgraduates: 146
- Location: Vivekananda Sarani, Kanyapur, Asansol, West Bengal, 713305, India; 23.7157922°N 86.950346°E
- Campus: Urban
- Approvals: AICTE; Department of Higher Education, Government of West Bengal; Ministry of Education (India), Government of India; National Board of Accreditation.
- Website: http://www.aecwb.edu.in/

- Location within West Bengal Location within India

The Asansol Engineering College (AEC) is a private engineering college in Asansol, West Bengal, India. It offers different undergraduate and postgraduate courses in Engineering and Technology and other allied fields. It was established in 1998 by The Academy of Engineers as a joint venture between the JIS Group and the Techno India Group.

== About College ==
The college is affiliated with Maulana Abul Kalam Azad University of Technology, West Bengal and all the relevant programs are approved by the All India Council for Technical Education and National Assessment and Accreditation Council (NAAC) Accreditation and National Board of Accreditation(CSE, ECE, ME) .

The college has a grant from the World Bank under Technical Education Quality Improvement Programme (TEQIP).

The campus is located along Vivekananda Sarani at Kanyapur, Asansol.

== Academics ==
The institute offers ten undergraduate courses:-

- B.Tech. in Electronics and Communication Engineering (ECE)- 4 years [Approved intake - 120]
- B.Tech. in Electrical Engineering (EE)- 4 years [Approved intake - 60]
- B.Tech. in Mechanical Engineering (ME)- 4 years [Approved intake - 60]
- B.Tech. in Computer Science and Engineering (CSE)- 4 years [Approved intake - 240]
- B.Tech. in Civil Engineering (CE)- 4 years [Approved intake - 30]
- B.Tech. in Information Technology (IT)- 4 years [Approved intake - 180]
- B.Tech. in Computer Science and Business Systems (CSBS)- 4 years [Approved intake - 60]
- B.Tech. in CSE (Artificial Intelligence and Machine Learning) (AIML)- 4 years [Approved intake - 60]
- B.Tech. in CSE (Internet of Things & Cyber Security Including BlockChain Technology) (CSE (IOT & CSIBCT))- 4 years [Approved intake - 60]
- B.Tech. in Electronics and Computer Science (AIML)- 4 years [Approved intake - 60]
- B.Tech. in Computer Science and Technology (AIML)- 4 years [Approved intake - 60]
- BCA- 4 years [Approved intake - 120]
- BBA- 4 years [Approved intake - 120]
- BBA (Insurance & Risk Management)- 4 years [Approved intake - 60]
- BHM (Bachelor of Hospital Management)- 4 years [Approved intake - 60]
- B.Sc. in Data Science- 4 years [Approved intake - 60]

The institute also offers three post-graduate courses:-

- M.Tech. in Electrical Engineering (EE)- 2 years [Approved intake - 13]
- M.Tech. in Electronics and Communication Engineering (ECE)- 2 years [Approved intake - 13]
- Master of Computer Applications (MCA) - 2 years [Approved intake - 60]

Proposed New Diploma Courses
1.Computer Science and Engineering (Intake 60)

2.Electronics and Communication Engineering (Intake 60)

3.Mechanical Engineering (Intake 60)

4.Electrical Engineering (Intake 60)

5.Civil Engineering (Intake 60)

Scholarship

1. NSP 2.0

2. SVMCM( Govt of W.B.)

3. WBFS

4. E-Kalyan

5. Aikyashree(Govt Of W.B.)

6. OASIS

7. JIS Scholarship

8. College Scholarship( For Core Branches)

== See also ==
- List of institutions of higher education in West Bengal
- Education in India
- Education in West Bengal
- Dr. B.C. Roy Engineering College, Durgapur
