= Coimbatore Marine College =

College in Tamil Nadu, India

- CMC
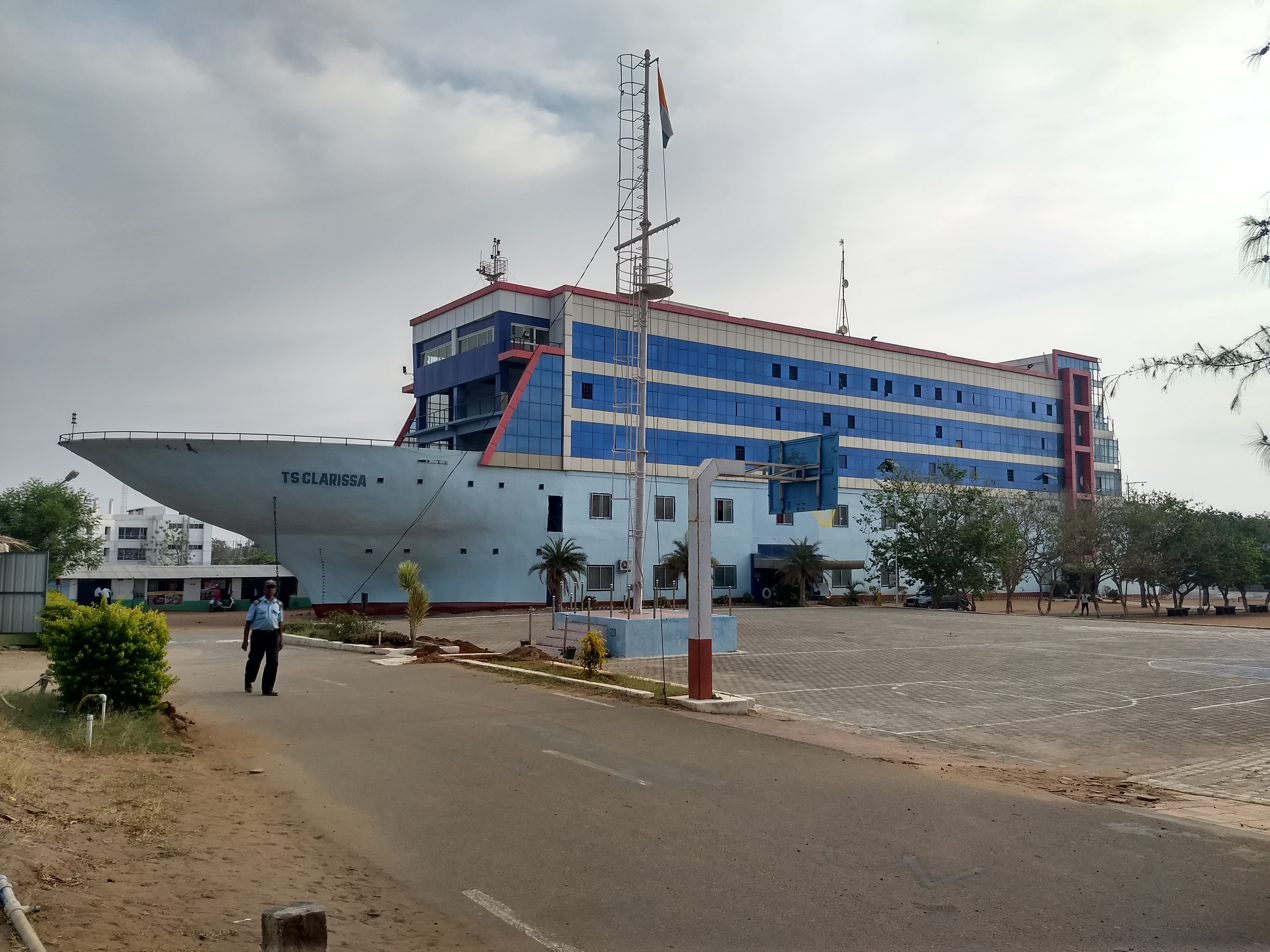
- TS CLARISSA ship in campus
- Motto: Eminence Through Excellence
- Type: Private
- Established: 2001
- Affiliations: IMU, BU, AU
- Chairman: S.I Nathan
- Students: 700+ (2017)
- Location: Coimbatore, Tamil Nadu, India; 10.51478°N 77.00395°E
- Campus: Urban
- Website: cmcmarine.in

Coimbatore Marine College is a college for maritime education and training in Coimbatore, Tamil Nadu, India, founded in 2001. The college offers education and training in pre-sea and post-sea training for candidates from cadets through masters of ships. The institute is recognised by the Directorate General of Shipping (DGS), Government of India, and is affiliated to Indian Maritime University.

== Departments ==
The major departments are:

- Nautical science
- Marine engineering
- Pre Sea Training courses
- ETO Training Courses
- Graduate Marine Engineering
- Orientation course for catering personnel
- Marine engineering (Lateral entry)
- BBA Logistics and shipping
- MBA Logistics and shipping
- B.Com logistics and shipping
- B.Com corporate secretaryship with C.A

== Accreditation ==
CMC and its courses are approved by the DGS, which is responsible for maritime administration and for overseeing maritime education and training in India.

== Admissions ==
Admissions for CMC B.Tech Courses are based on All India level online exams conducted by Indian Maritime University. The preliminary round of entrance examinations are done online. Admissions for other courses are done after interview at the college campus.

== Campus ==
The campus is a 10 acres (4.0 hectares) area, with outdoor and indoor sports facilities like cricket, basketball, badminton, volleyball, table tennis, and carom, with a swimming pool and a gym.

The college has a model ship on campus for training marine engineers called TS Clarissa.

The college has a residential arrangement with both a boys' and girls' hostel facility on the campus.
