= S. M. Cyril =

Irish-Indian educationist (1936–2023)

S.M. Cyril
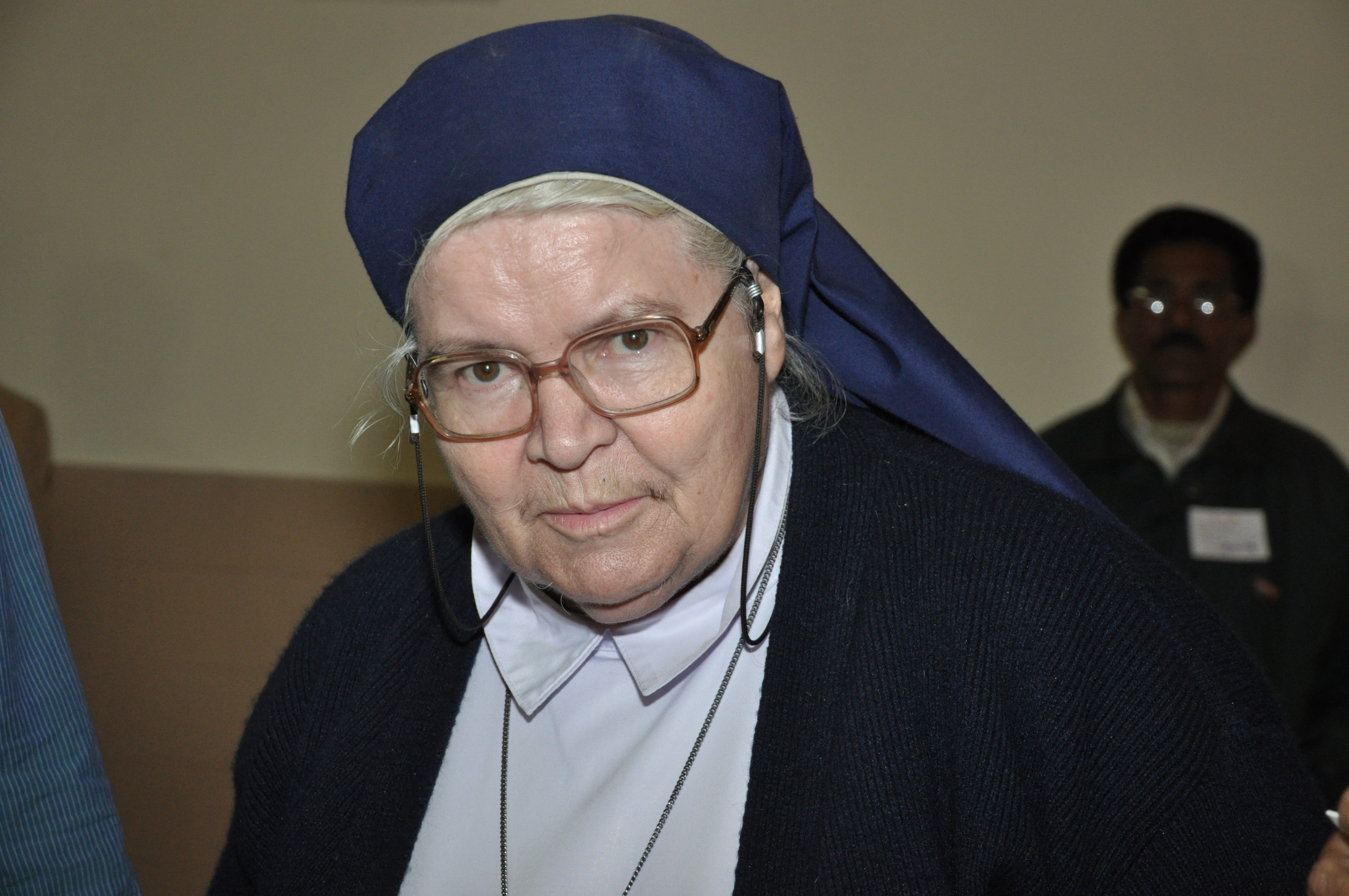
- Born: 21 July 1936; Bray, County Wicklow, Ireland
- Died: 24 June 2023 (aged 86); Kolkata, India
- Other names: Sister M. Cyril Mooney; Sister Mary Cyril
- Known for: Nun; Educationist

Sister M. Cyril Mooney, IBVM (21 July 1936 – 24 June 2023) was an India-based Irish nun, educationist, educational innovator and 2007 winner of the Padma Shri Award, the Government of India's fourth-highest civilian honour. She received awards including recognition by UNESCO (1994) and the International Christian Stewardship Award in 2002 given by the U.S. Conference of Catholic Bishops.

A native of Ireland, she grew up in Wolfe Tone Square, Bray, where she became a messenger for her mother handing out magazines for the Holy Ghost Fathers' Missions. She won a scholarship to Loreto Convent in Bray, and took orders in 1955 into the Institute of the Blessed Virgin Mary.

She had lived and worked in India since 1956, where she emerged as a nationwide leader in bringing quality education to urban and rural poor children. Under her Rainbow School Programme, "We mandated ourselves that we would take 25% of poor children every time we did admissions, and over time this moved up to 50%, Mooney said in an interview with The Irish Times in 2015. "To help street children keep up their attendance, accommodation was provided on site in a model that has been copied by the West Bengal government."

== Background ==
Professed a Sister of the Institute of the Blessed Virgin Mary (1955), she arrived in India on 10 October 1956. She earned a PhD in Zoology (Lucknow, Uttar Pradesh, India). From 1979, she was Principal of the Loreto Day School Sealdah.

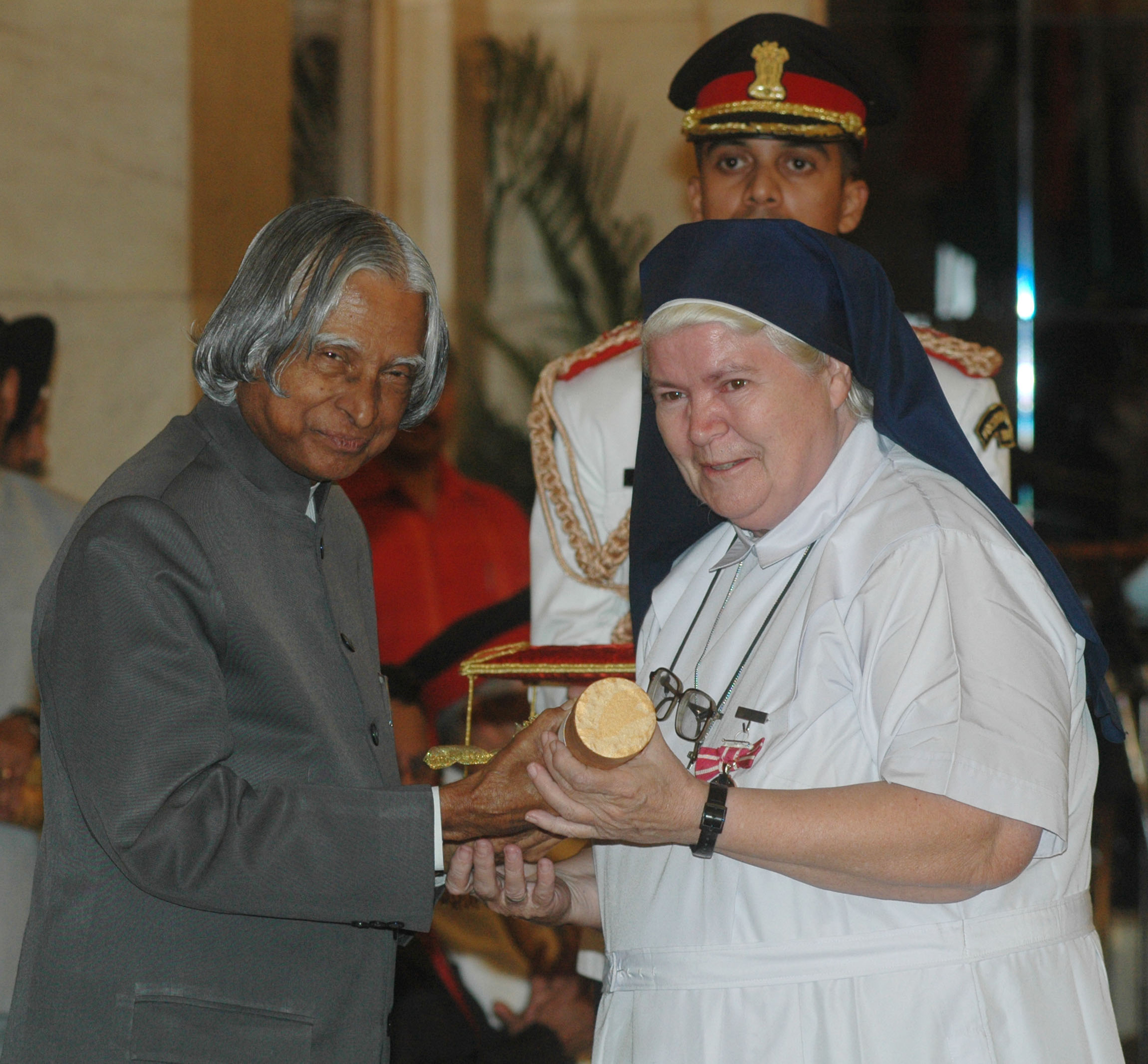
The President, Dr. A.P.J. Abdul Kalam presenting Padma Shri to Sister M Cyril Mooney (Teacher Cum Social Worker), at an Investiture Ceremony at Rashtrapati Bhavan in New Delhi on 23 March 2007

== Death ==
S. M. Cyril died in Kolkata on 24 June 2023 at the age of 86.

== Civic honours/awards ==
- 2015: Saint Michael's College Honorary Doctor of Humane Letters
- 2013: Irish Presidential Distinguished Service Award
- 2012: Aparajita award from Rupashi Bangla (Public Choice)
- 2011: Monmouth University's Global Visionary Award
- 2007: Padma Shri Award, the fourth highest civilian honour granted by the Indian government
- 2002: International Christian Stewardship Award, Bishops of America.
- 2000: The Kolkata Telegraph Award for Creative Excellence
- 1994: The NOMA Award for Spreading Literacy, UNESCO
- The Kolkata Telegraph Award for Social Service (7 times)
- Friend of Child In Need Institute (CINI) Award

== See also ==
- Education in Kolkata
