= Techno India Group =

Private schools and colleges in Kolkata, India

Techno India™

- Type: Public
- Industry: Education
- Founded: 1985; 41 years ago
- Founders: Gautam Roychowdhury, Satyam Roychowdhury
- Headquarters: Kolkata, West Bengal, India
- Area served: Republic of India
- Website: technoindiagroup.com

Techno India Group is a private educational conglomerate group in India. The main office of this group is situated in Salt Lake City in Kolkata, West Bengal.

== Techno India Group universities ==
- Techno India University
- Sister Nivedita University
- Techno Global University
- Techno Global University, Sironj

Sources: Techno India University

== Techno India Group Engineering colleges ==
- Techno Main Salt Lake
- Netaji Subhash Engineering College
- Bengal Institute of Technology
- Meghnad Saha Institute of Technology
- Asansol Engineering College
- Abacus Institute of Engineering and Management
- Techno International New Town
- Techno India Institute of Technology
- Techno India Kolkata
- Techno India Hooghly
- Techno Institute of Engineering and Management, Habra
- Techno International Batanagar
- Techno India Durgapur
- Saroj Mohan Institute of Technology
- Siliguri Institute of Technology
- Asansol Engineering College
- Dumka Engineering College

Sources: Netaji Subhash Engineering College
Techno India Public school

== Gallery ==
Techno India

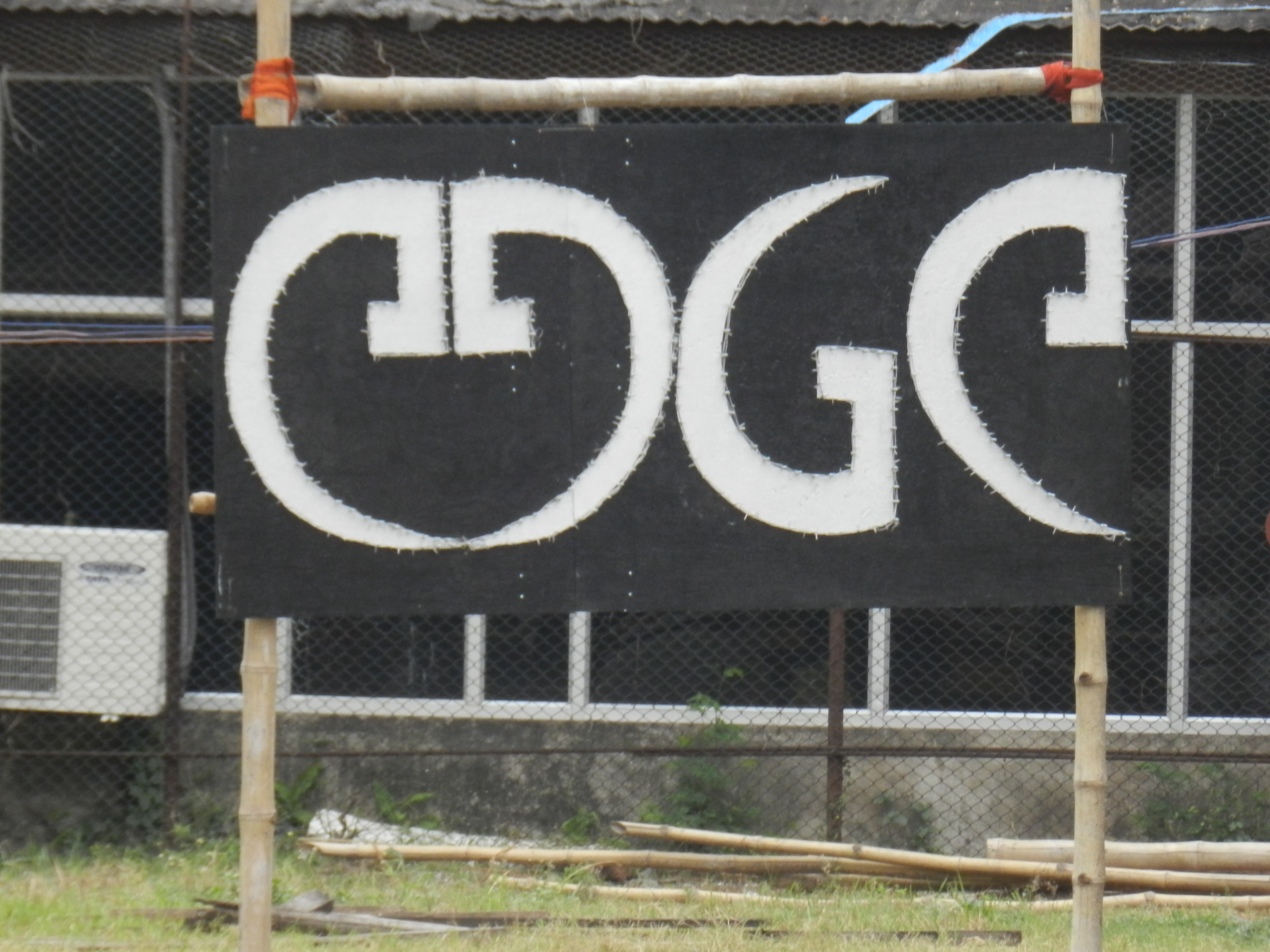
EDGE 2018

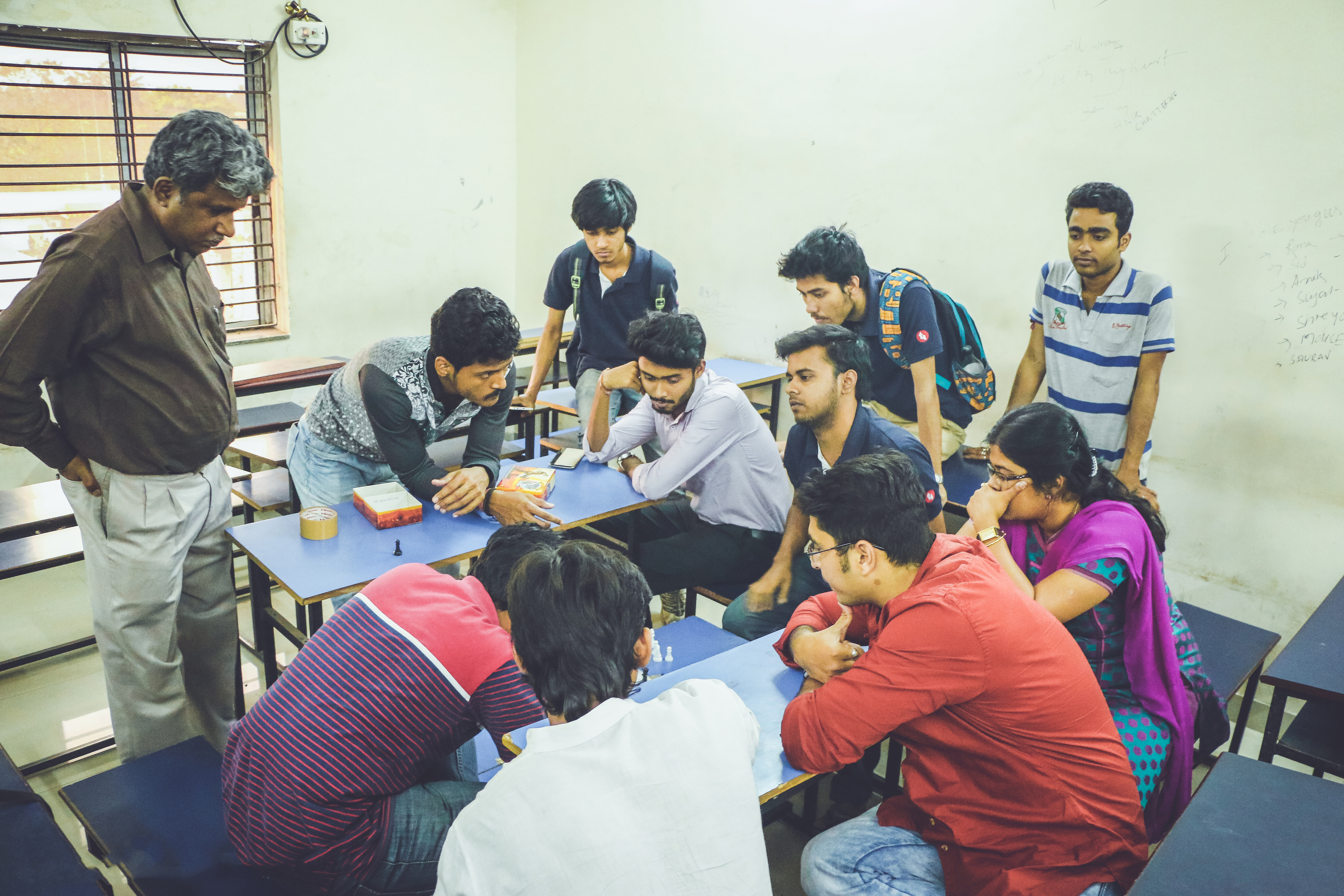
The Tournament 2017, final chess match, Techno India Salt Lake

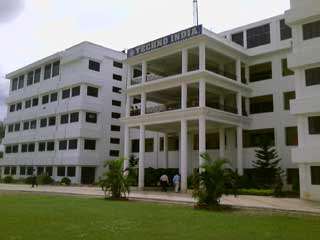
Techno India Main Building

== See also ==
- Aryan FC
- Education in West Bengal
- List of institutions of higher education in West Bengal
- Education in India
