= MillenniumPost =

English-language daily newspaper

- No Half Truths

- Front page of the Kolkata edition on November 5, 2026
- Type: Daily newspaper
- Format: Broadsheet
- Owner: Techno India Group
- Founder: Durbar Ganguly
- Publisher: Front Row Media
- Editor-in-chief: Durbar Ganguly
- Founded: May 2, 2012
- Language: English
- Headquarters: New Delhi, India
- Country: India
- Circulation: 198,958 (Note: The circulation of the Kolkata edition of MillenniumPost is about 90,000 copies daily. The circulation of its Delhi edition is referred by the Press Registrar General of India to be 108,958.)
- Sister newspapers: Aajkaal
- Website: millenniumpost.in

MillenniumPost is a daily English newspaper based and headquartered in New Delhi, India, with a major office in its other location and edition in Kolkata, West Bengal. The circulation of its Kolkata edition is around 90,000, with a daily frequency. The main editions of the newspaper are in the cities of Kolkata, New Delhi, and Siliguri. Its typical publications are 12-pages long on broadsheet-format paper, though some special editions released by MillenniumPost are longer.

== History and acquisition ==
MillenniumPost was founded on May 2, 2012, by Durbar Ganguly, who started both its broadsheet newspaper and the affiliated website. Ganguly was a former vice chairman and joint managing director of a company named the Pioneer Group. The newspaper had a major headquarters in Kolkata, West Bengal.

The newspaper was originally reported to be launched in the last week of April 2012 with an initial of 75,000 copies, with Ganguly promoting MillenniumPost and announcing appointments of two senior-level executives within his company Pioneer Group. On May 2, when it was launched in New Delhi, the newspaper got subscriptions on about 10,000 of its copies. Ganguly collaborated with Central News Agency to increase availability of news on hotels and newsstands. He shared that he planned the news to enter in Lucknow, Bhubaneswar, Ranchi and Chandigarh. It conceived the tagline (motto) "No Half Truths" in the newspaper.

In October 2022, it was acquired by the Techno India Group, who were the owners of Bengali-language newspaper Aajkaal. According to sources, Ganguly said that while the publication faced difficult times before, the introduction of additional funding and capital would help MillenniumPost for its future and the increased resources available for it.

Satyam Roy Chowdhury, the managing director of Techno India Group and the chairman of Aajkaal Publishers, tweeted on October 10, 2022, "Techno India Group just added another feather to its cap through the acquisition of MillenniumPost. MillenniumPost is an English language daily published simultaneously from Delhi and Kolkata." The headquarters of it were moved from Kolkata to New Delhi in Delhi in India.

Both the newspaper and Aajkaal Publishers were considered to have close connections with the political party Trinamool Congress by the time of its acquisition. Chief executive officer Sanku Bose spoke to a newspaper about it, where he stated that the purchase of an English-language newspaper [MillenniumPost] was part of their "long-term business strategy" and to get exposure to their institutes. The purchase of the newspaper and a majority stake in it was formally done by Satyam Roy Chowdhury.

== Content ==
MillenniumPost was launched as a 16-page broadsheet English-language daily newspaper, with color print. It has its headquarters in New Delhi and also an edition based in there. Its other editions include a Kolkata and Siliguri edition. Ganguly serves as the newspaper's editor-in-chief, from when it was purchased by Techno India Group. As of January 2023, it was printed and published by Jaiyendra Kumar Sharma; the Delhi edition was printed in the Indian Express plant in Noida and the Kolkata edition was printed in the Aajkaal press in Kolkata. Most of its publications were restricted to 12 pages instead of 16 after the purchase.

=== Jason Jones allegations ===
On May 8, 2014, MillenniumPost released a news article about Canadian-American actor Jason Jones, beginning with the text "New most scientific poll displays that 97% of Indian voters trust award wanting fake journalist Jason Jones to deliver best Lok Sabha coverage in 2014." According to Newslaundry, there was no mention about the methodology of the scientific poll. Arunabh Saikia writing for the Newslaundry article described Jones as a correspondent of The Daily Show, an American satirical show that aired on the channel Comedy Central. Jones came in India to look at how the media was covering the "biggest democratic exercise in the world". A video was released about it, which showed Jones approaching a MillenniumPost reporter after receiving news from S. Y. Quraishi about paid news in India. The article was published without any checks or edits indicating sponsorship.

The reporter spoke initially that she was against the practice of paid reporting in Indian newspapers. Later, Jones asked the reporter to write a story on him in exchange for money, which became the unsourced scientific poll article. According to Zoë Schlanger of Newsweek, Jones paid $2,500 for the article, which appeared in both the print and e-paper versions. By May 23, 2014, MillenniumPost took off the unsourced article from the website and e-paper and issued statements about the matter. Ganguly said that the reporter was an intern and not a regular employee, saying that they would take remedial actions about it, and said they got to know the matter recently. He considered legal action against The Daily Show and denied allegations of paid news.
