= International Maritime Institute =

- Type: Private
- Established: 1991
- Affiliations: Director General of Shipping, Government of India, AICTE, Indian Maritime University, Uttar Pradesh Technical University
- Principal: Capt Saurabh Varshney
- Director: Mr. Kapil Bhalla
- Location: Greater Noida, Uttar Pradesh, India
- Nickname: IMi
- Website: www.imi.edu.in

International Maritime Institute (also known as IMI) is a private marine engineering college in Greater Noida, Uttar Pradesh, India. It was founded in 1991.

== History ==
IMI was established in 1991.
