= Indian Maritime University =

Maritime college in India

- भारतीय समुद्री विश्वविद्यालय
- Motto: IAST: samudra jñānaṃ jñāna samudram
- Motto in English: “Knowledge is an ocean; the ocean is knowledge”
- Type: Public
- Established: 14 November 2008; 17 years ago
- Chancellor: Vacant
- Vice-Chancellor: Dr. Venkata Ramana Akkaraju
- Visitor: President of India
- Administrative staff: 150
- Location: Indian Maritime University (India), India
- Campus: Chennai (HQ), Kochi, Kolkata, Mumbai, Visakhapatnam
- Acronym: IMU
- Website: imu.edu.in

The Indian Maritime University, abbreviated as IMU, is a public central university directly under the Ministry of Ports, Shipping and Waterways, in India. IMU is the national institution for maritime education, commercial shipping, marine engineering, and maritime administration. It is India's prestigious institution for the training of merchant Navy officers.

IMU is highly regarded as the number 1 maritime institute in India. Admissions are done through IMUCET entrance examination, which is conducted every year across the country. It was established by the Indian Maritime University Act 2008, on 14 November 2008. Before the foundation of IMU, there were seven teaching and research institutes under the Ministry of Shipping. The following legacy institutes were subsumed under IMU in 2008.

- National Maritime Academy, Chennai
- Training Ship Chanakya, Mumbai
- Lal Bahadur Shastri College of Advanced Maritime Studies & Research, Mumbai
- Marine Engineering and Research Institute, Mumbai
- Marine Engineering and Research Institute, Kolkata
- Indian Institute of Port Management, Kolkata
- National Ship Design & Research Centre, Visakhapatnam

It has an All-India jurisdiction and the headquarters is at Chennai. It has six campuses in Chennai, Kochi, Kolkata, Mumbai Port, Navi Mumbai, and Visakhapatnam.

== History ==
Chennai Campus

The Chennai campus has a history dating back to 1984 when the National Institute of Port Management (NIPM) was established by the Government of India as an independent body. The NIPM provided professional training courses to individuals working in the ports sector with technical assistance from UNDP. Later it came to be known as National Maritime Academy and after the formation of IMU in 2008, it is now known as Indian Maritime University – Chennai campus. The campus houses the academic block, hostel, residential and recreational facilities.

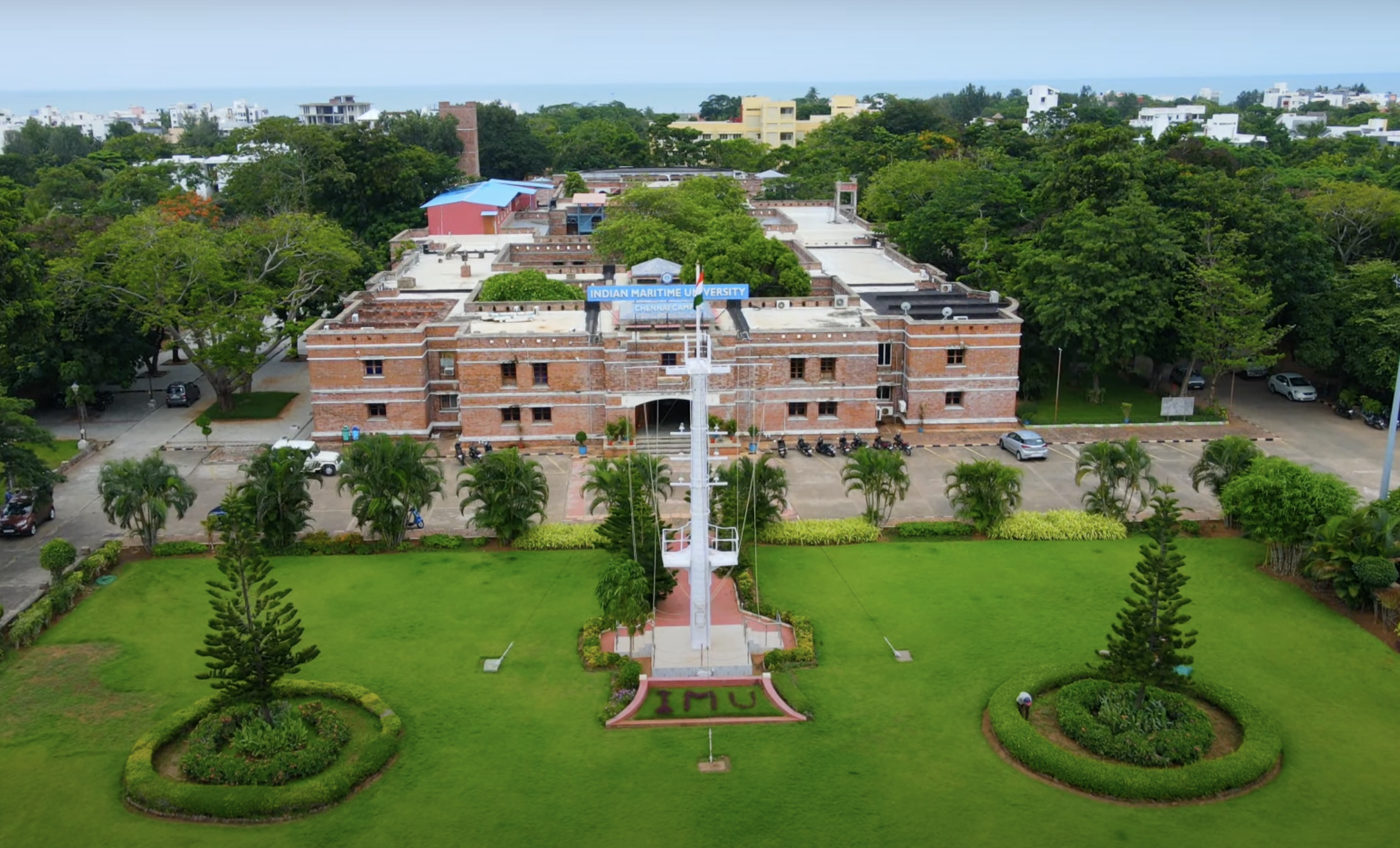
IMU chennai campus

The academy was established with the technical assistance from UNDP / UNCTAD. It is credited with ISO 9001:2000 Certification and accredited as grade 1 rating by ICRA.

IMU Chennai offers the following academic programs:

- B.Sc., in Nautical Science
- B.Tech. in Marine Engineering
- Diploma in Nautical Science
- MBA in Port and Shipping Management
- MBA in International Transportation and Logistics Management
- BBA in Logistics, Retailing and E-Commerce
- Post Sea / STCW Courses

== Affiliated colleges ==
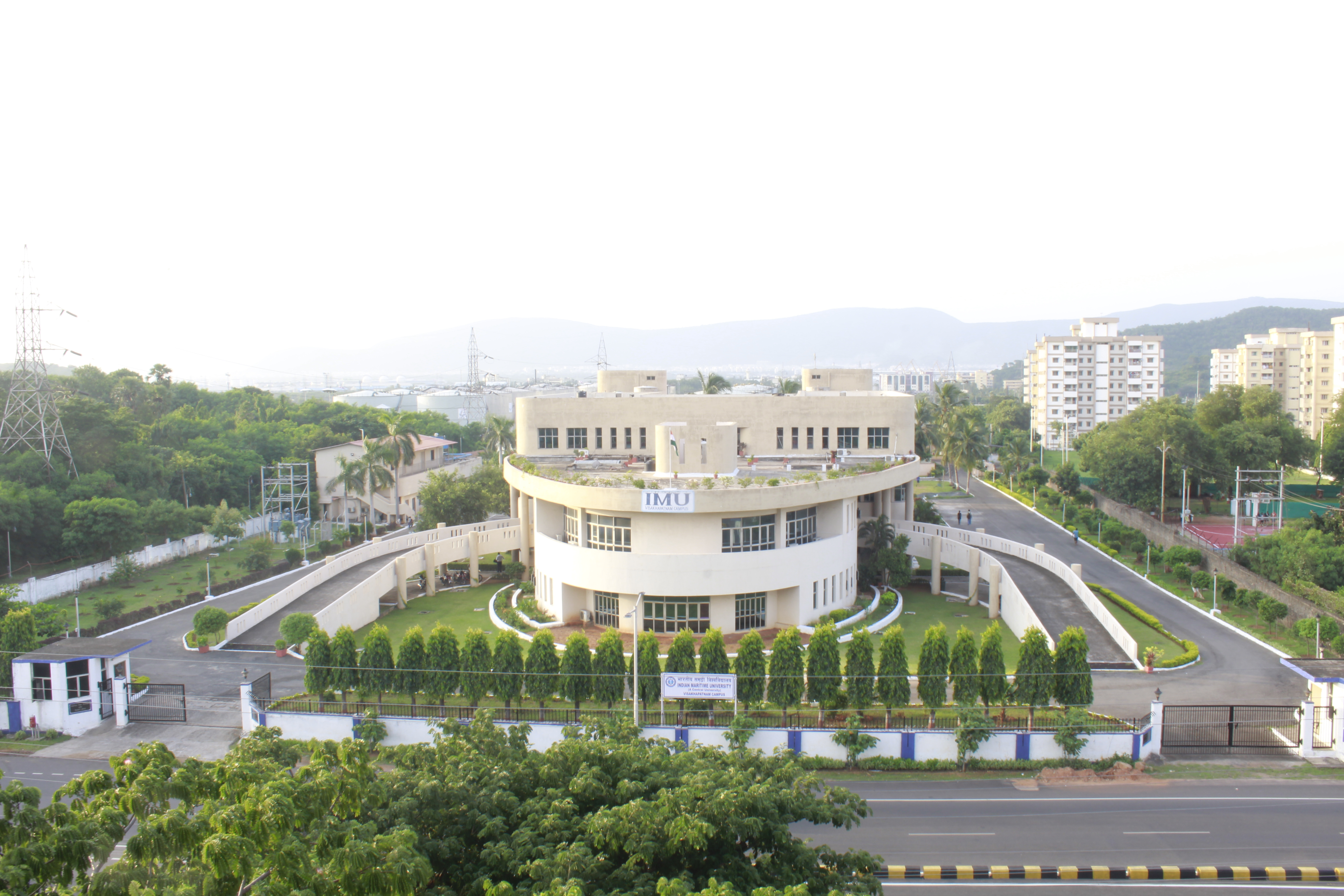
IMU campus in Visakhapatnam

Following are list of colleges affiliated under IMU. As of 2025, there were 21 colleges.

No.	Name of college	Location
1	Anglo-Eastern Maritime Academy	Karjat
2	Applied Research International School of Maritime Studies	Delhi
3	Coimbatore Marine College	Coimbatore
4	College of Ship Technology	Palakkad
5	Dr. Ambedkar Institute of Technology	Sri Vijaya Puram
6	Euro Tech Maritime Academy	Aluva
7	HIMT College (Hindustan Institute of Maritime Training)	Chennai
8	International Maritime Institute	Greater Noida
9	MMTI'S Education & Research Trust	Khalapur
10	Park Maritime Academy	Coimbatore
11	Maritime Training Institute (SCI)	Powai
12	Maritime Training Institute (SCI)	Thoothukudi
13	RL Institute of Nautical Sciences	Madurai
14	Samundra Institute of Maritime Studies	Lonavala
15	Sriram Institute of Marine Studies	Delhi
16	Southern Academy of Maritime Studies	Panapakkam
17	The Great Eastern Institute of Maritime Studies	Lonavala
18	Tolani Maritime Institute	Induri
19	Training Ship Rahman	Mumbai
20	Vishwakarma Maritime Institute	Pune
21	Yak Education Trust	Khopoli
