= Dadu Indurikar =

Dadu Raghu Sarode popularly known as Dadu Indurikar was a Tamasha person from the state of Maharashtra, India. He was born in Induri in Pune district, and belonged to a family of tamasha artists and apprenticed his art under his grandfather, father and Mukund Lahiri all notable artists. He started his own phad - troupe after the death of his father. He popularised the vag "Gadhvacha lagna". It is considered that Dada Kondke imbibed the traditions of tamasha under Indurikar. He is said to have lived his senior years in financial distress.

== Awards and achievements ==
- Sangeet Natak Academy award for tamasha.
- President's medal for role in fostering tamasha.
