= JIS Health City Santragachi =

General information
- Location: Santragachi, Howrah, West Bengal, India
- Status: Under construction
- Category: Health City
- Area: 30 acres (12 ha)

Construction
- Constructed: 2022-2027 (planned to be fully completed)
- Authority: Department of Health & Family Welfare, Government of West Bengal; JIS Group

JIS Health City is under construction health-themed residency in Santragachi, Howrah district in the Indian state of West Bengal. It will be West Bengal's first residential project developed and aimed along the line of health services.

== Formation ==
The city was planned and launched during Bengal Global Business Summit 2022. It is expected to be built along the Kona Expressway, NH12 on a 30 acres plot. With a cost of ₹1,000 Crores, JIS group plans to construct the city.

== The city ==
The city has the JIS School of Medical Science & Research at the centre of the city. JISMSR was inaugurated by Chief Minister Mamata Banerjee on 24 July 2023. The institute contains a hospital with 1,200 beds. The health city will have six towers of 20 floors each as the residencies.
