= College Square Mall =

College Square Mall may refer to:

- College Square Mall (Iowa), a shopping mall in Cedar Falls, Iowa
- College Square Mall (Tennessee), a shopping mall in Morristown, Tennessee

== See also ==
- College Square (disambiguation)
