= Aajkaal =

Bengali newspaper in Kolkata, India

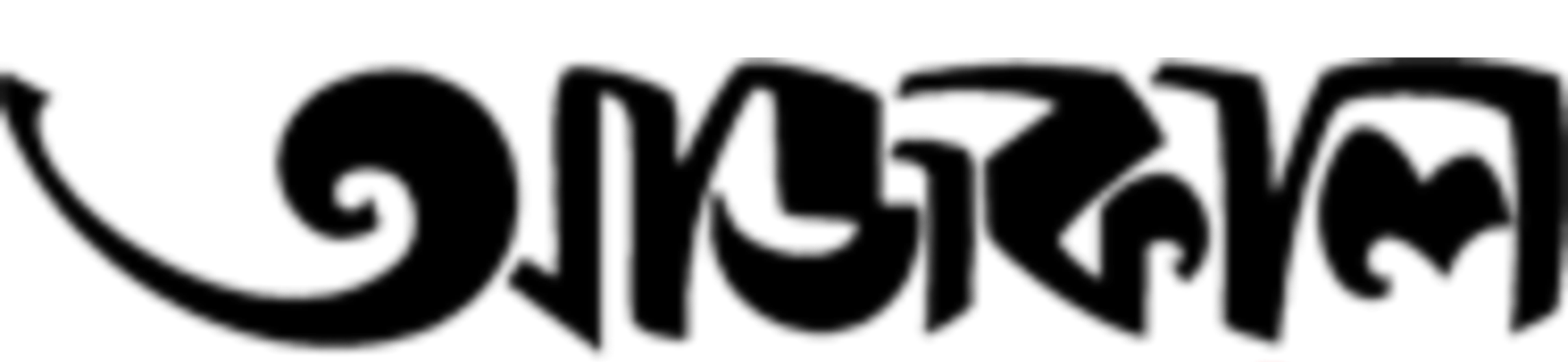

- Front page of 28 March 2012
- Type: Daily newspaper
- Format: Broadsheet
- Owner: Aajkaal Publishers Pvt. Ltd.
- Publisher: Aajkaal Publishers Pvt. Ltd.
- Editor: Asoke Dasgupta
- Founded: 1981
- Language: Bengali
- Headquarters: Kolkata, India
- Sister newspapers: MillenniumPost
- Website: www.aajkaal.in

Aajkaal (Bengali: আজকাল, pronounced [ˈadʒkal]) is a Bengali newspaper which is one of the principal newspapers published in Kolkata, India. It covers myriad subjects (broadly business, entertainment, politics, etc.) from Kolkata and the world, and has developed a reputation for political neutrality and "strong principles and authentic reporting." The newspaper was started in 1981 by Abhik Kumar Ghosh and includes an evening edition Sandhya Aajkaal and an online edition. Its sister newspaper is MillenniumPost, from when it was acquired by the owner. Aajkaal also has editions which are published in Siliguri, and Agartala in Tripula state.

== History ==
Abhik Kumar Ghosh helped establish the paper in 1981. Chief editor at the time was Gour Kishore Ghosh, "a veteran journalist and socialist," who helped to make the paper popular and credible. The current Editor in chief is Ashok Dasgupta, an established sports journalist.

In May 2021, Samir Dhar, a correspondent of the Aajkal Tripura branch of the newspaper, was attacked. This was the third time since 2018. Arriving on motorcycles, "The miscreants, said to be supporters of the ruling party in the area, ... [armed] with sharp weapons and carried out the attack. They also used obscene language against the senior journalist", the Assembly of Journalists said. The Assembly demanded a full investigation and immediate arrests of the perpetrators.
