= College Square =

College Square may refer to:

- College Square (Dublin), a mixed-use development in Dublin, Ireland, under construction as of 2023
- College Square (Ottawa), a shopping centre in Ottawa, Canada

== See also ==
- College Square Mall (disambiguation)
