= Techno International New Town =

Engineering college in West Bengal, India

Techno International Newtown
- Former name: Techno India College Of Technology(TICT)
- Type: Private
- Established: 2005
- Affiliations: Maulana Abul Kalam Azad University of Technology
- Registrar: Dr. S.P. Ghosh
- Faculty: 80+
- Administrative staff: 20+
- Students: 1000 (per academic year)
- Undergraduates: 850 (per academic year)
- Postgraduates: 150 (per academic year)
- Location: 1/1, Service Rd, DG Block(Newtown), Action Area I, Newtown, Kolkata, West Bengal, 700156, India; 22.5783721°N 88.47467°E
- Campus: Urban
- Approvals: All India Council for Technical Education
- Nickname: TINT
- Website: tint.edu.in

- Location in West Bengal Location in India

Techno International Newtown, formerly Known as Techno India College Of Technology(TICT), is an engineering college in West Bengal, India. It is the seventh college established by the Techno India Group. The college is located on 5 acres (20,000 m^{2}) of land in the Megacity (New Town) area of Rajarhat, North 24 Parganas. It is affiliated with Maulana Abul Kalam Azad University of Technology(formerly known as West Bengal University of Technology) and its courses are approved by All India Council of Technical Education.

== Admission ==
Admission to the B.Tech courses on the basis of West Bengal Joint Entrance Examination and Joint Entrance Examination. Admission to other courses are based on criteria decided by the Academic Council of the University.

== Departments at TINT ==
- Computer Science and Engineering
- Information Technology
- Electronics & Comm. Engg
- Electrical Engineering
- Mechanical Engineering
- Civil Engineering
- Applied Electronics & Instrumentation Engineering
- MCA/BCA
- BBA
- Basic Science and Humanities

== Student life ==
=== Clubs ===
- TINT PHOTOGRAPHY CLUB
- TINT Coding Club
- HRIDMAJHARE- TINT Music Club
- TINT Talkies - TINT Film & Drama Club
- LITWITS - TINT Literary Club

=== Technical Fest and Cultural Fest ===
==== Prabuddha ====
Prabuddha is the technical festival organized every year at the college.

==== Yagvik ====
Yagvik is the cultural festival organized every year at the college.

- In 2007 : Band performance by Prithibi and Parikrama (band).
- In 2008 : Band performance by Love Runs Blind, concert by Amit Sana.
- In 2011 : Band performance by Faridkot and Underground Authority.
- In 2012 : Band performance by Somlata Acharyya Chowdhury and The Aces, Prachir, EKA and SiXthVeda.
- In 2013 : Performance by Silajit Majumder and concert by Mohammad Irfan Ali.
- In 2014 : Band performance by Fossils (band) and performance by Anjan Dutt.
- In 2016 : Performance by Amit Mishra of Manwa Emotion Jaage fame from Dilwale (2015 film).
- In 2019: Performance by Emon Chatterjee
- In 2023 : Band performance by T.R.A.P. (band)

=== Hostel ===
There are separate hostels for boys and girls, which are located near the college. The boys' hostel is situated near by the Dlf IT-Park which is hardly five minutes from the college, and the girls' hostel is in Kaikhali, from where a college bus is available.

== Notable alumni ==
- Susmita Chatterjee

== See also ==
- List of institutions of higher education in West Bengal
- Education in India
- Education in West Bengal
