= JIS School of Medical Science & Research =

Medical college in West Bengal, India

- Type: Private Medical College & Hospital
- Established: July 24, 2023; 3 years ago
- Affiliations: National Medical Commission
- Academic affiliations: JIS University
- Chairman: Taranjit Singh
- Principal: Dr. Anup Kumar Das
- Students: Totals: MBBS - 150; MD - 23
- Location: Santragachi, Howrah, West Bengal, India
- Colors: White and Blue
- Website: jismsr.org

JIS School of Medical Science & Research (JISMSR), established in 2023, is a private medical college located in Santragachi, Howrah, West Bengal, India. It offers the Bachelor of Medicine and Bachelor of Surgery (MBBS) and MD degree courses. The college is recognized by the National Medical Commission and affiliated with the JIS University. Presently, it is under the PPP model and Howrah District Hospital is the associated teaching hospital of this college.

== History ==
JIS School of Medical Science & Research was established in 2023 by the JIS Group Educational Initiatives, with the goal of developing a cutting-edge educational facility and top-notch healthcare facilities in West Bengal. It was launched at the Bengal Global Business Summit 2022, under the affiliation of Department of Health and Family Welfare, Government of West Bengal.

It will be a part of the JIS Health City Santragachi.

== Academics ==
JIS School of Medical Science & Research is affiliated to JIS University and recognized by the National Medical Commission. With meeting international standards and seeking to diversify educational prospects, preclinical, paraclinical and postgraduate courses are expected to come up in near future. It offers 150 undergraduate seats for MBBS and 23 postgraduate seats for MD presently.

== Departments ==
The departments in JIS School of Medical Science & Research are as follows:

- Department of Anesthesiology
- Department of Anatomy
- Department of Biochemistry
- Department of Community Medicine
- Department of Dentistry
- Department of Dermatology
- Department of ENT (Ear, Nose and Throat)
- Department of General Medicine
- Department of General Surgery
- Department of Obstetrics & Gynaecology
- Department of Ophthalmology
- Department of Orthopaedics
- Department of Paediatrics
- Department of Radiology
- Department of Microbiology
- Department of Pathology
- Department of Pharmacology
- Department of Physiology
- Department of Psychiatry
- Department of Forensic Medicine

== Facilities ==
=== Academic facilities ===
The college has lecture theatres with state-of-the-art technology and interactive learning.

There is a central library with a vast collection of medical textbooks and newly built and functional labs and a dissection hall, for pre-clinical and clinical subjects. Various workshops take place often.

Currently, it is tied to Howrah District Hospital for teaching.

=== Hostels ===
There are two hostels and canteens, one for each gender, on the Santragachi campus.

=== Sports and cultural activities ===
The college has an equipped gym with basic facilities as of now. Indoor games like chess, carrom and table tennis are available.

The college actively takes part in inter-college sports competitions like football, cricket and badminton.

There is an intra-college fest that allows the students to exhibit their talent in activities such as music, dance and drama, etc. There are multiple clubs for cultural activities as well.

== See also ==
- JIS University
- JIS Health City Santragachi
- Narula Institute of Technology
- Guru Nanak Institute of Dental Sciences and Research
