= Business and Computing =

A Business and Computing is a dual degree program offered jointly by some computing and business schools. The program generally lasts four-five years instead of seven-eight years to complete separate the two degrees and results in the candidate earning both a Bachelor of Business degree and a Bachelor of Computing degree. Graduating Business and Computing students may choose to work on computing/technical matter, or enter the business world, or even enjoy the gray area between business and computing fields such as IT security officer, IT consultant, etc. Even though a majority of Business and Computing graduate from a single university, there are people who earn these degrees from different universities.

== Degree Overview ==
A course which allows you to develop both technical skills and business knowledge. Learning and understanding technical computer skills in the systems analysis and software engineering, alongside gaining experience in finance, simulation and project management.

Covering computing subjects such as algorithms, software engineering, social implications of computing, data structure, operating systems and fundamental mathematics, with business subjects such as accounting, human resource management, business policy/communication, law, finance, marketing and organizational behaviour.

Earning you both a Bachelor of Computer Science degree and a Bachelor of Business Administration degree.

== Core Computing modules ==
- Managing Information – Understanding the management techniques that are used to collect information to communicate it within and outside an organization, helping enable managers to make quicker and better decisions.
- Information System – Understanding a set of integrated components which collect, store and process data, that can also deliver information, knowledge and digital products.
- Software Engineering – Understanding the application that covers the technical aspects of building software systems, and also maintains management issues, including budgeting and directing programming teams.
- Database Principles and Applications – Understanding the core technology and base of information system, that provides basic knowledge to help develop information systems which lays a good foundation for scientific research and subsequent professional courses.
- Multimedia and Human Computer Interaction – Understanding the inter-disciplinary field which brings together physiology and computer science to understand people’s human’s interaction with technology.
- Communications and Networking – Understanding the several type of networking, such as intranet, extranet and internet and how computers or devices connected to one another can exchange data.

== Core Business Modules ==
- Managing organisations – Investigating organisational behaviour and human resource management.
- Management and Information Technology – Gaining knowledge in understanding the concepts, debates and issues in areas of change management, project management, and information technology management/systems development.

== Universities ==
Business and Computing dual degrees are studied in only certain universities around the world, combined most commonly with computer science or Business Administration. Countries include the United States, United Kingdom, Canada Singapore, Ireland, Zimbabwe, Kenya and Uganda. Six universities that teach the degree are:

=== United States ===
Stanford Graduate School of Business located in California teaches MS in Computer Science/MBA degree which is a three-year course that will contain studying MBA courses in the first year, and both computer science and Business and in your second and third year.

New Jersey Institute of Technology located in New Jersey teaches BS in Computing and Business degree which is a four-year course that will contain both Computer Science and Business courses.

=== Canada ===
University of Waterloo and Wilfrid Laurier University, both located in Waterloo, Ontario region jointly teaches Business Administration and Computer Science Double Degree which is a five-year course that will cover subjects from computer programming, operating systems at University of Waterloo to business communication and human resource management at Wilfrid Laurier University. A similar program is offered exclusively at Wilfrid Laurier University with lower admission requirements and automatic admission into co-op compared to the mandatory admission of the former program.

=== Singapore ===
Nanyang Technological University located in Jurong West teaches Double Degree Programme Bachelor of Business (Information Technology) and Bachelor of Engineering (Computer Science) which is a four-year course teaching subjects from computing systems, computational thinking to strategic management, compiler techniques.

=== Saudi Arabia ===
http://www.psu.edu.sa located in Riyadh in Prince Sultan University which is a four years course that will cover subjects from Computer and Business

=== Zimbabwe ===
University of Zimbabwe Located in Harare; capital city of Zimbabwe. Offers Honours Bachelor of Business Studies and Computing Science (HBSCT) as a four year program. Alumni of the HBSCT program have found opportunities as Systems Analysts, Software Development Management Posts in Commercial and Financial Services, Insurance, Banking and the Public Sector, IT auditors and Digital marketing specialists.

Kenya

Jomo Kenyatta University of Agriculture and Technology located in Juja a town in Kenya. Offers Bachelor of Science Business Computing as a four year program.
