= Santragachhi =

Santragachi
- Neighbourhood
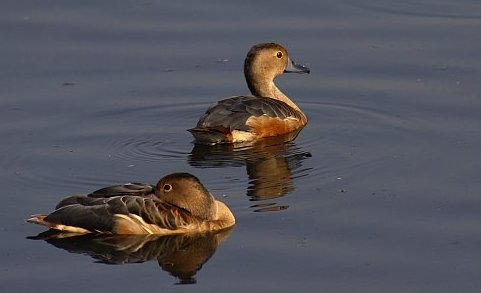
- Lesser whistling duck in Santragachi Lake

- Location in West Bengal, India Santragachi (West Bengal) Santragachi (India)
- Coordinates: 22.58017°N 88.26963°E
- Country: India
- State: West Bengal
- Division: Presidency
- District: Howrah
- City: Howrah

Government
  - Type: Municipal Corporation
  - Body: Howrah Municipal Corporation

Languages
  - Official: Hindi, Bengali, English, Tamil, Magahi
- Time zone: UTC+5:30 (IST)
- PIN: 711109, 711111, 711112
- Telephone code: +91 33
- ISO 3166 code: ISO 3166-2:IN
- Vehicle registration: WB
- HMC wards: 46, 47
- Lok Sabha constituency: Howrah
- Vidhan Sabha constituency: Howrah Dakshin and Shibpur

Santragachi is a neighbourhood in Howrah of Howrah district in the Indian state of West Bengal. It is a part of the area covered by Kolkata Metropolitan Development Authority (KMDA). Santragachi Junction in Santragachi is one of the five intercity railway junctions of Howrah-Kolkata, which serves as a railway junction-cum-terminus for the South Eastern Railway. Kona Expressway in Santragachi is one of the major and fastest roads to enter Kolkata.

== History ==
In the early twentieth century, Santragachhi was a large village, with a part within Howrah Municipality. According to a legend, the principal family there, the Choudharys, who were Barendra brahmins, started staying here 300 years from now. Inspired by them, other Barendra families moved to the place. The railway station of Santragachhi was named after this place, though this place is closer to another railway station at Ramrajatala. The Ramrajatala area was considered a quarter of the area under this village.

The first vernacular school of the Howrah district was established in Santragachhi in 1857 with the help of a government grant. Afterwards the school was amalgamated with "Santragachi Madhya Engreji School" making it an English and Bengali dual medium school and later in 1925, the school transferred to Santragachi Kedarnath Institution. The first girls' school of the Howrah district with Indian management was established in Santragachhi in 1863, with a small grant from the government.

Santragachhi produced good quality of arums (ol: Bengali: ওল). There is a variety of Amorphophallus paeoniifolius (elephant-foot yam of arum family) which is named Santragachhi after this place.

== Education ==
=== High schools ===
There are several secondary and higher secondary schools for boys and girls. Sir Ashutosh Mukherjee laid the foundation stone of Santragachi Kedarnath Institution, whilst Jagacha High School is another notable school in this area. Other government schools include Santragachi Bhanumati Balika Vidhyalaya, S.E. Railway Mixed Higher Secondary School, Santragachi Mixed High School, Santragachi Railway Colony High School, Baksara High School, Surendranath Girls' School . Private schools include St. Marys Convent School, Maria's Day School. There is also a branch of Kendriya Vidhyalaya, which is affiliated to CBSE Board.

=== Colleges ===
Colleges in the area include Dr. Kanailal Bhattacharya College and Bijoy Krishna Girls' College.

The area also has the JIS School of Medical Science & Research and JIS Health City Santragachi under development.

Research Organization

The environmental and cultural research organization like Margastha Research Foundation is the neighborhood of this area. The organization offers internships program on Biodiversity Conservation, Botany, Zoology, Child Psychology, IoT, E-Commerce as per the New Education policy, 2020.

== Santragachi Jheel ==
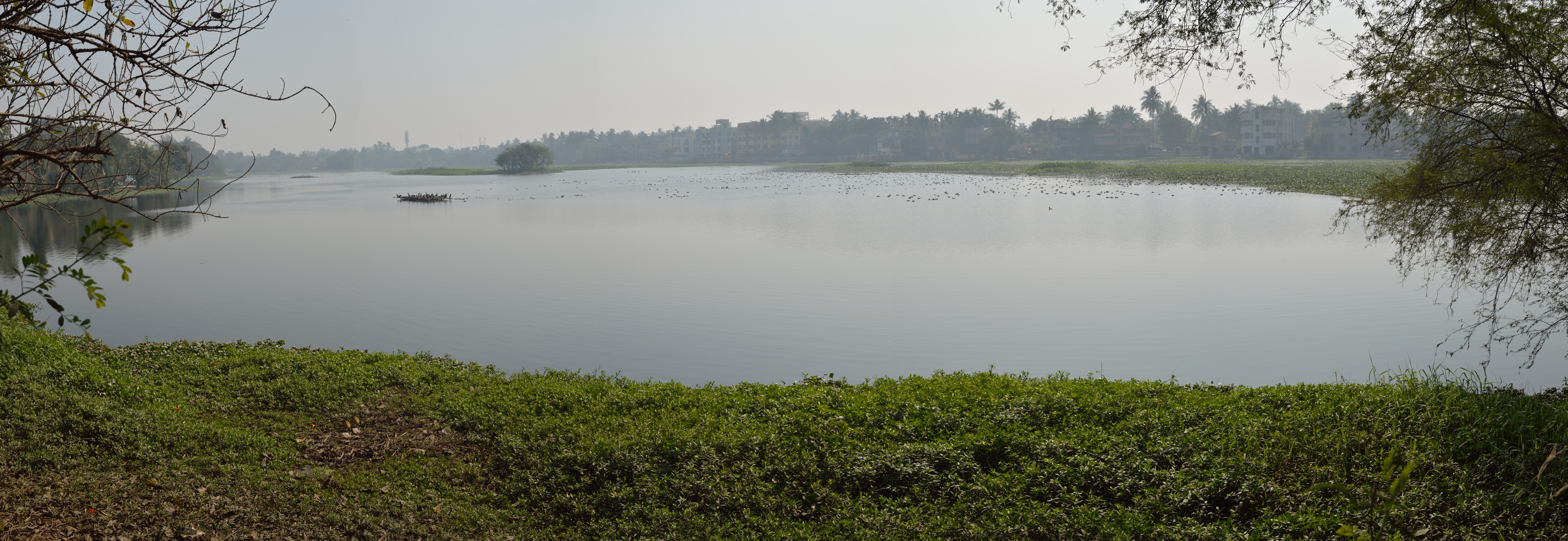
Western side of the Santragachhi Lake

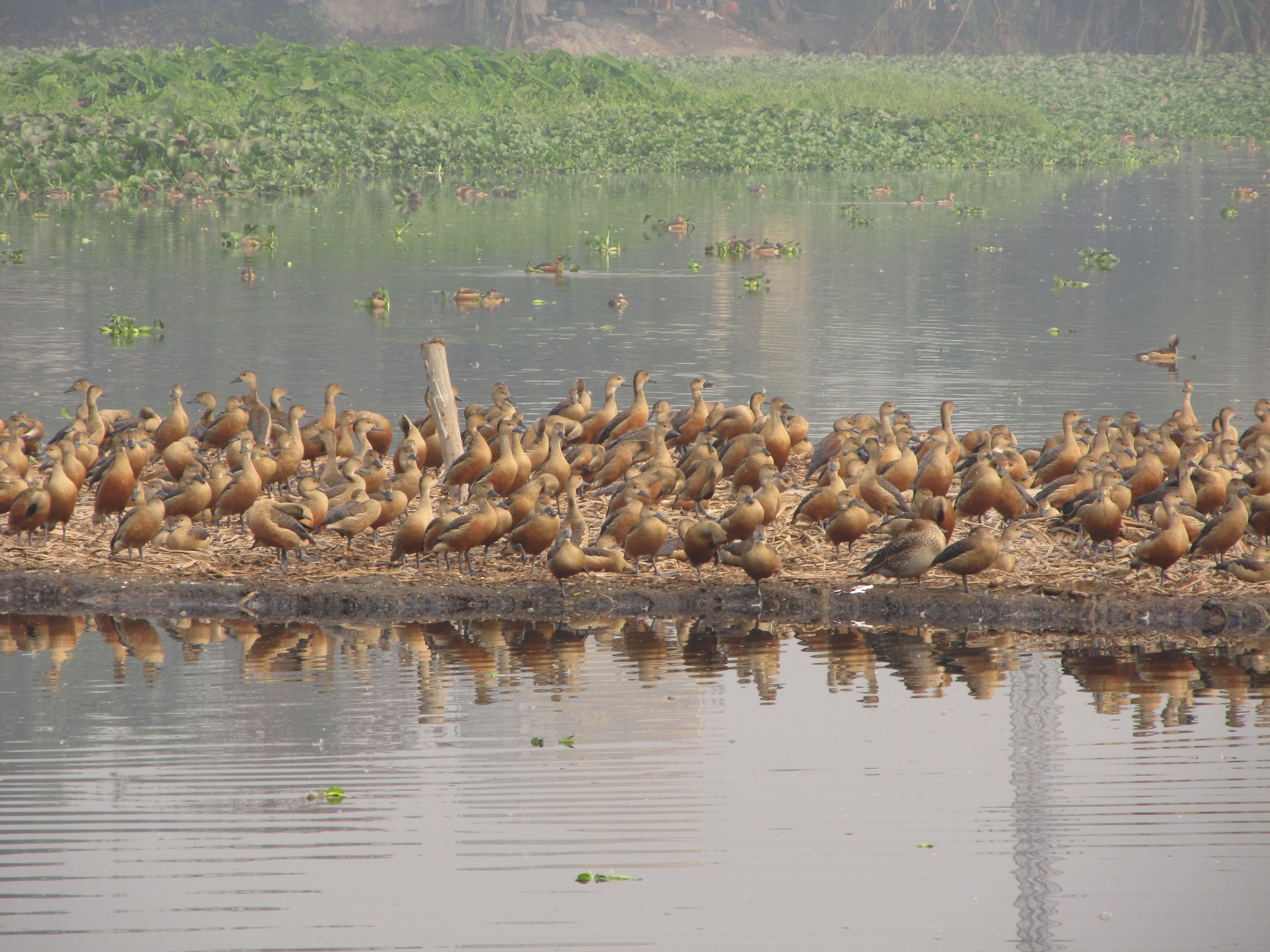
The lesser whistling ducks dominate the entire lake

Santragachi Jheel is a large lake, located next to the Santragachi railway station. It has Chhottodal Club at one end while the Wagon Factory (Reymon) at the other end adjacent to Sneha Birds View, a residential complex. One of the bank has local markets and railway station adjacent to Baksara bazar while the other bank mostly consists of residential complexes. This lake attracts large number of migratory birds in the winter months, particularly in December and January. The number has increased in recent years, as migratory birds have started to avoid destinations like the lakes in Alipore Zoo, Kolkata. Birds like sarus crane from North America and Australia, gadwall, northern shoveller, northern pintail, garganey from north of the Himalayas and many other local migratory birds such as cotton pygmy goose and knob-billed duck are spotted here during this season. However, the lesser whistling duck is the most dominant species visible here.

The lake area is owned by South Eastern Railway, though the Forest Department of West Bengal also looks after the place. Every year before the migratory birds are expected to arrive, the Forest department cleans Water hyacinth from the lake, though leaving some portion of it which adds up to an environment suitable for the birds. Efforts are made by local residents, Forest Department and Railways to improve the environment for the birds.

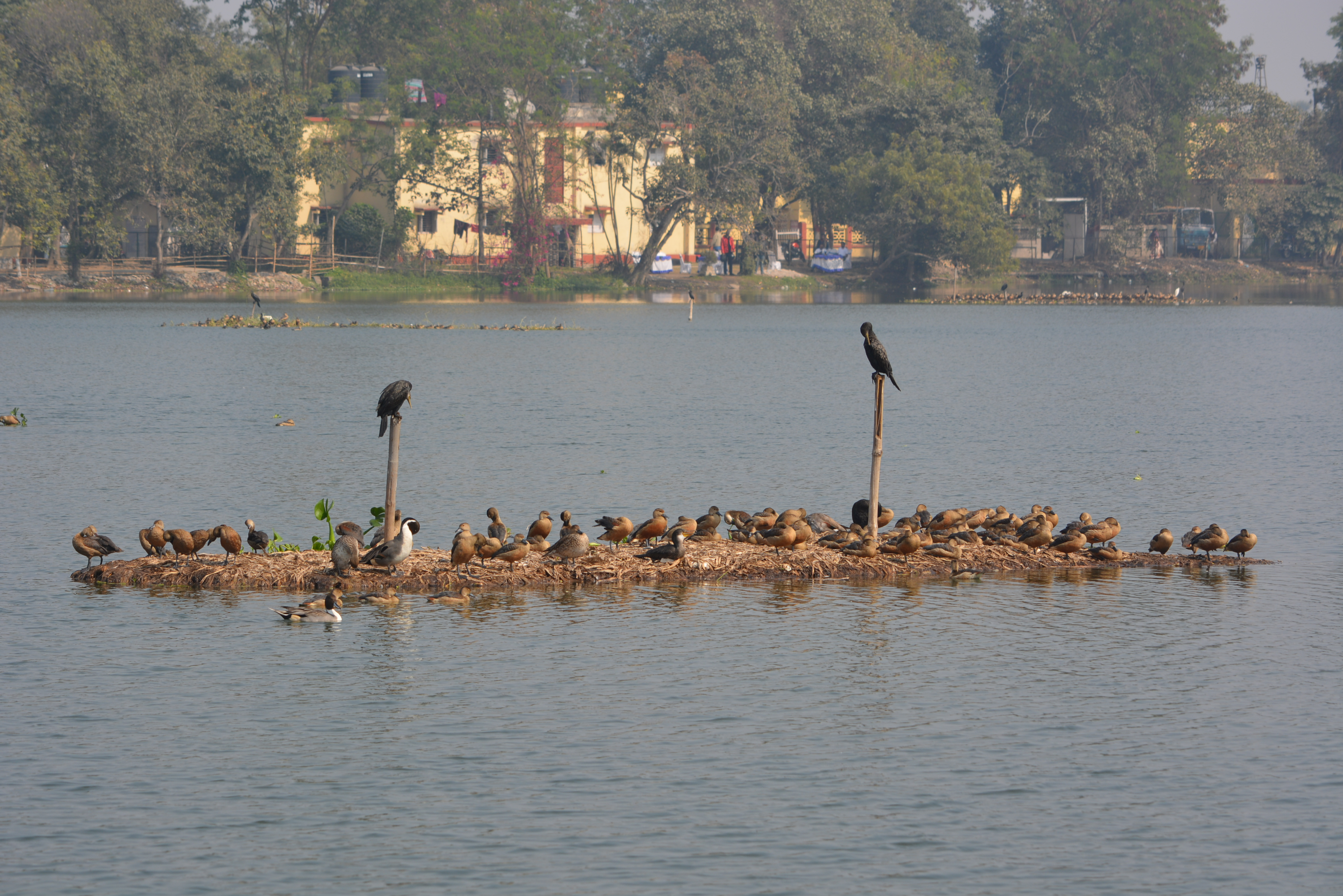
Migratory birds in Satragachhi Jheel

The Forest Ministry of the State Government of West Bengal intends to convert the lake to a wildlife conservation centre.

== Transport ==
=== Railways ===
The erstwhile Bengal Nagpur Railway, now known as South Eastern Railway, was connected to Howrah station in 1900. At this time, the 3-mile-long (5 km) short branch from Santragachi to Shalimar Station was also created to redirect heavy traffic of export goods, for further carrying them to Kidderpore dock in Kolkata via large ferry steamers.

Santragachi is the main railway coaching yard of South Eastern Railway's Kharagpur Division. Maintenance of more than 50 long or short-distance trains has been done here. The class-one flat yard consists of a diesel locomotive shed, an electric locomotive shed, washing and sick lines and a railway turntable.

Santragachi railway station is now a railway junction. There are plans of developing Santragachi Junction into a full-fledged terminal, with more trains originating and departing from here, over the next 3–4 years to reduce congestion at Howrah Station.

=== Roadways ===
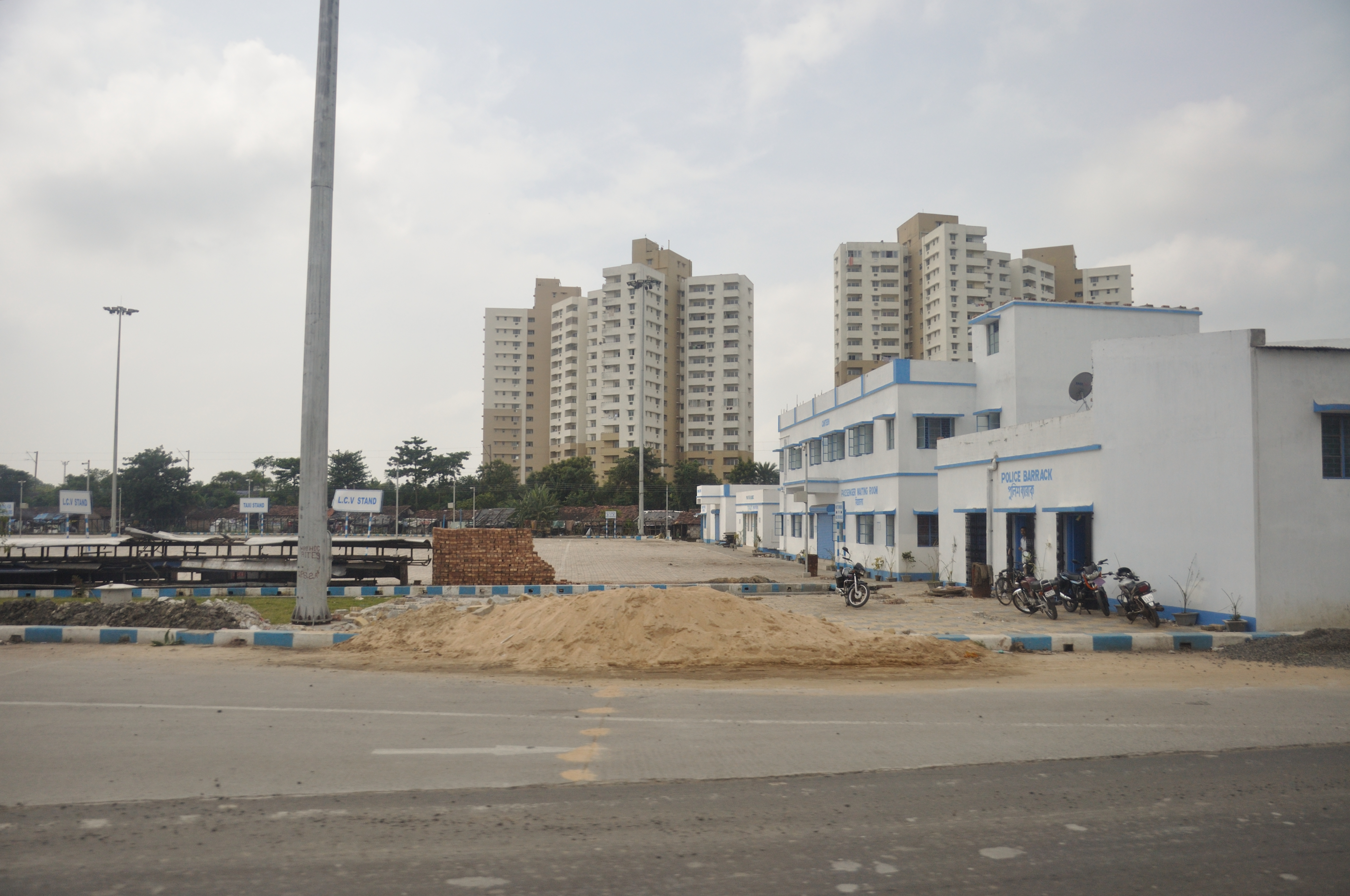
Kolkata Central Bus Terminus and Unitech Gateway Apartments on Kona Expressway, Santragachi

Santragachi is crossed by Kona Expressway (NH 12), which connects to Kolkata via Vidyasagar Setu and towards rest of the NH 16 and to the NH 19. Santragachi has a big bus terminus having buses like Barasat-Newtown-Santragachi, Barasat-Ultadanga-Santragachi, DN-17(Barasat-Sealdah-Santragachi), KB15 (Santragachi-Anandapur), EB1A (to Belgharia), VS12 (to New Town) etc. Many buses also pass through Santragachhi like - K11 (Domjur - Rabindra Sadan), 26 (Mini) (Unsani - Esplanade), C11 (Domjur - B.B.D. Bagh/Belgachia), E6 (Amta - Esplanade), E7 (Bagnan - Esplanade) etc.

Kolkata Central Bus Terminus, spread over 12.38 acres (5.01 ha) of land, is the result of the joint efforts by the state transport department, HRBC and KMDA. While Kolkata Metropolitan Development Authority (KMDA) contributed in handing over land to install the facility, Hooghly River Bridge Commissioners (HRBC) remained the implementing authority. Chief minister Mamata Banerjee inaugurated the terminus on 27 May 2015. The terminus has a parking capacity for 169 buses, 100 other vehicles and 85 two wheelers.

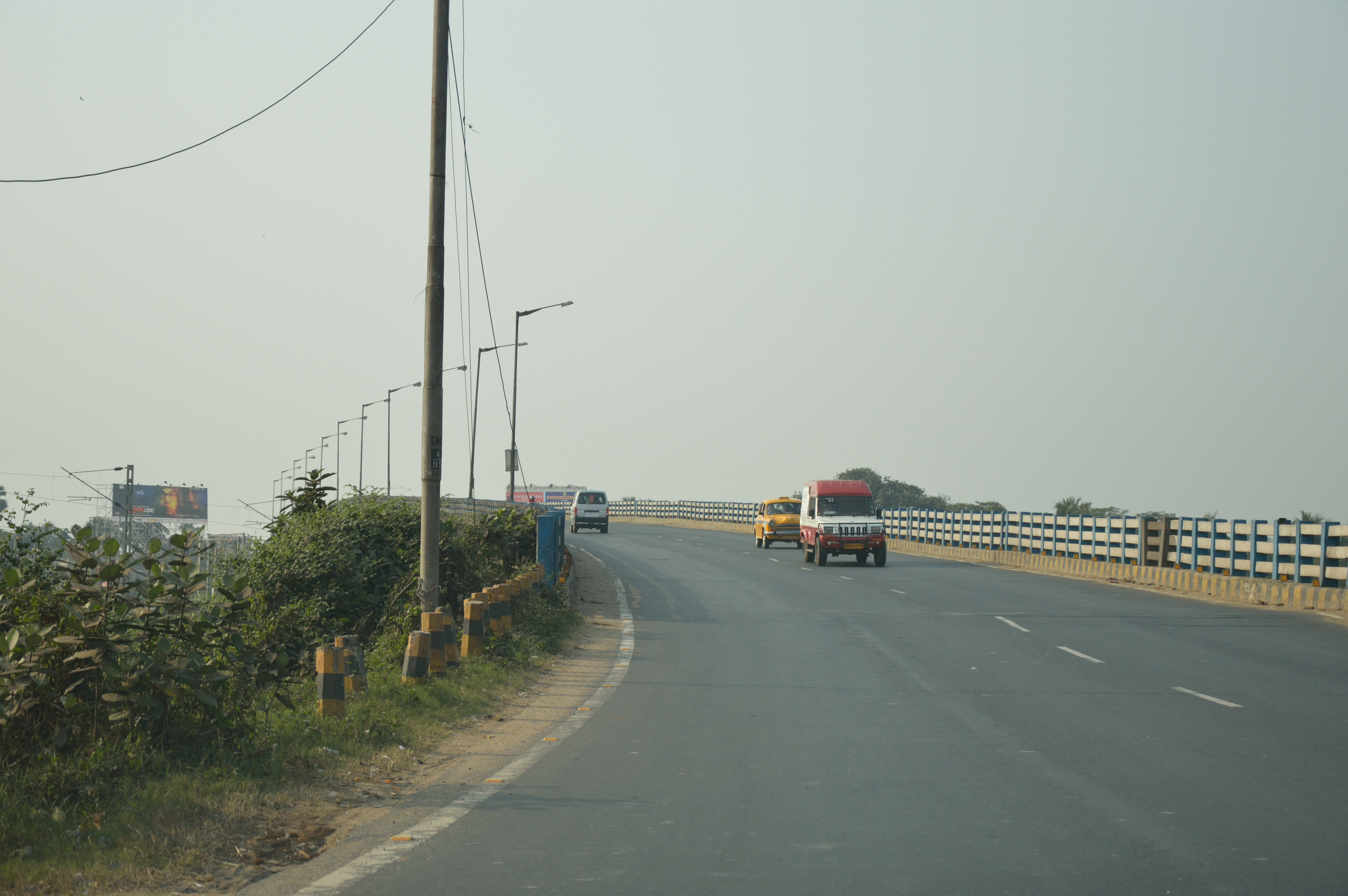
Santragachhi Rail Overbridge

=== Metro Rail ===
A 10 km (6.2 mi) east-west Metro extension project from Howrah Maidan up to Santragachi bus terminus has been planned and up to Dhulagarh has been proposed. Rites, the implementing agency for this project, was set to start work on the corridor early in 2017, but the work is still halted due to land acquisition and fund issues.

== Citations ==
- O'Malley, L.S.S.; Chakravarti, Monmohan (1909), Bengal District Gazetteers: Howrah, Bengal Secretariat Book Depot.
