= Indian Maritime University Kolkata =

Research University in Kolkata, India

Indian Maritime University - Kolkata Campus
- Former names: Directorate of Marine Engineering Training (1949); Marine Engineering And Research Institute
- Motto: IAST: samudra jñānaṃ jñāna samudram
- Motto in English: “Knowledge is an ocean; the ocean is knowledge”
- Type: Public university; Central University
- Established: August 10, 1949; 77 years ago (as DMET)
- Parent institution: Indian Maritime University
- Academic affiliations: UGC; AICTE
- Director: R. Adm. Amit Bose, VSM (Retd.)
- Academic staff: 33
- Students: 1,124
- Undergraduates: 984
- Postgraduates: 140
- Location: Kolkata, West Bengal, India; 22°31′36.26″N 88°17′50.56″E
- Campus: Metropolis 33 acres (13 ha)
- Language: English
- Nickname: IMU-KC
- Website: www.imu.edu.in/imunew/kolkata-campus

The Indian Maritime University - Kolkata Campus (formerly known as the Marine Engineering and Research Institute (MERI) and the Directorate of Marine Engineering Training (DMET)) is a post-secondary institution in India specialising in marine engineering.

== History ==
Marine engineering training in India had its beginning in 1927 on board the training ship Dufferin. Eight years prior, the first Indian owned vessel, the S.S. Loyalty sailed out of Bombay Harbour on 5 April 1919 for London. The vessel was owned by M/S. Scindia Steam Navigation Company. The Master and the other officers were British. Subsequently, Sir P. S. Sivaswamy Iyer, KCSI, CIE moved a resolution in the Indian Legislature to train Indians for the merchant marine. The R.I.M.S. Dufferin was acquired by the Department of Commerce and commissioned as a training ship.

In November 1927, the first batch of 50 nautical cadets joined the I.M.M.T.S. Dufferin under the command of Capt. Superintendent Sir Henry Digby Beste. In 1935, training of engineering cadets commenced on the Dufferin with each batch consisting of 25 nautical and 25 engineering cadets.

Some famous graduates were Capt. M. J. Sayeed of NOL, Vice Admiral R. D. Katari, India's first Indian Chief of Naval Staff, DMET's founding Deputy Directors S. Kasthuri (who later went on to head INS Shivaji and Cochin Shipyard) and T.K.T. Srisailam At least eight of the Dufferin's graduates rose to be admirals. Many of the graduates rose to be the Principal Examiner of Engineers and the Chief Surveyor to the Government of India. At least one, K. Ramakrishna, was appointed as the Principal Examiner of Engineers at the Department of Trade, UK.

In 1947, the newly independent country's founders foresaw the need for an up-to-date Merchant Marine. Article 246 of the Seventh Schedule of the Constitution of India mandates that the Indian Union has jurisdiction and the responsibility for "Maritime shipping and navigation, including shipping and navigation on tidal waters; provision of education and training for the mercantile marine and regulation of such education and training provided by States and other agencies."

On the recommendation of the Merchant Navy Officers Training Committee, constituted in 1947 by the Government of India, the function of pre-sea training of marine engineers was transferred ashore under a new name. The Directorate of Marine Engineering Training (DMET) began operations on 10 August 1949, in temporary facilities in Boribunder in Bombay, and Gorachand Road in Park Circus, Calcutta, with a total intake of 50 students (20 at Bombay and 30 at Calcutta). The institute moved into new facilities in Taratala Road in 1953 and Lower Parel in 1966.

The new building in Calcutta was inaugurated as the Marine Engineering College on 14 December 1953 by Prime Minister Jawaharlal Nehru, with the Transport Minister Lal Bahadur Shastri in attendance. J.S.H. Stephenson assumed Directorship in Calcutta. S. Kasthuri was Deputy Director at Calcutta and T.K.T. Srisailam was appointed Deputy Director at Bombay. K.S. Subramaniam, Motee L. Jagtianie and B.D. Merchant were appointed as officers in the Calcutta branch.

Students trained at marine workshops during the day and attended classes by at night for the three years of the program. The fourth year was devoted fully to classroom instruction at Calcutta. In August 1958, the intake was increased to 60 students and to 100 in the subsequent year. In 1962, an all-India entrance examination was introduced to streamline the standard of the incoming class. In 1982, the Institute of Engineers (India) started recognizing DMET graduates with a First Class (Motor or Steam) licence as equivalent to a graduate engineer, with the right to be called a Chartered Engineer and use "C. Eng (I)" after their names.

In 1975, the Indian shipping industry for the first time felt the requirement for graduate mechanical engineers. Since then, graduate mechanical engineers from institutions like NITs, Punjab Engineering College (PEC), UIET (Chandigarh), College of Engineering Pune and state government colleges have been passing out from MERI (DMET), Bombay. Initially, the course was for six months and was named as Post-Graduate Course in Marine Engineering issued by Govt. of India. Later the course gained its recognition as Post-Graduate Diploma in Marine Engineering (PGDME) issued by IMU.

In 1977–78, an expert committee nominated by the government of India, headed by Prof. Shankar Lal, ex-Director of IIT Kharagpur, recommended changes in the DMET course curriculum, mainly pertaining to class contact hours and practical training. The incorporation of these changes led to the recognition of the graduation certificate of the four-year course at DMET, as being equivalent to a first degree in Marine Engineering, by the Government of India, starting in 1983.

As part of a revamp of the marine engineering training process in India, in October 1991, the government of India appointed a Committee on Maritime Education and Training (COMET), under the chairmanship of Dr. Chandrika Prasad Srivastava, ex-Secretary General of International Maritime Organization, to study the status of all maritime training institutes in the country and present recommendations. Based on COMET's findings, the Merchant Marine Education and Research Trust (MMERT) was formed with the assistance of ship owners' associations, as a first step towards the formation of an Indian Maritime University, to supervise and control maritime education at Indian institutes. In 2001, MERI (Mumbai) launched a dual-degree course in Maritime Science, with admissions through IIT-JEE Extension List.

The Indian marine engineer became synonymous with DMET. Almost every major shipping company in the world has at least one DMETian in its onshore management personnel or floating staff. Many of the world's largest vessels, the ULCCs, are crewed by Indian marine engineers. DMET graduates went on to found marine engineering workshops, build companies, found maritime training institutes, develop surveying standards, and pursue careers in management.

=== Recent history ===
The four government-owned maritime institutes – LBS CAMSAR Mumbai, TS Chanakya, Navi Mumbai, MERI Kolkata, and MERI Mumbai – were integrated under the auspices of the Indian Maritime University in 2008.

DMET/MERI celebrated its Diamond Jubilee on 14 December 2010.

On June 28, 2025, a significant milestone was achieved at the Indian Maritime University’s Kolkata Campus in Taratala with the laying of the foundation stone for the Dr. Ravi K Mehrotra Centre of Excellence in Maritime (CoEM). As a Centre of Excellence, the CoEM is poised to become a leading hub for advanced maritime studies and innovation. It is expected to focus on critical areas such as Maritime technology, Sustainable shipping practices, Training and development of skilled professionals for the global maritime sector.

== Academic Programs ==
=== Undergraduate Programs ===
- B.Tech in Marine Engineering

=== Postgraduate Programs ===
- M.Tech in Marine Technology
- MBA in Port Management

== Training ==
IMU Kolkata has a workshop with machinery, equipment, steam engine and a diesel engine (Kawasaki-MAN, 6000 BHP) for training and to meet IMO and AICTE requirements. Students visit marine workshops for on the job training. Laboratories are provided for cadets/students to conduct practical experiments. Class rooms and teaching aids are in compliance with AICTE requirements.

A new establishment for the training of cadets in basic firefighting is being set up in the campus and is projected to near completion soon.

IMU Kolkata Campus now holds the honor of having a humongous working steam reciprocating engine by the efforts of the cadets and the workshop faculty itself who have restored the previously idle engine. It receives steam from a CT Package boiler, or a Foster Wheeler boiler that is independently fired and is capable of superheating the steam.

The Ministry of Education and Culture accorded approval to the graduation certificate issued by the institution as being equivalent to a bachelor's degree in Marine Engineering with effect from 1980–1983 course for the purpose of recruitment to posts under the Central Government.

The Graduation certificate issued by the institution received recognition from the Institution of Engineers (India) as an exempting qualification from their A and B examinations from 1982 onwards.

The course has the approval of AICTE.

In order to meet the IMO requirements for marine engineers working on board ship the training curriculum has been oriented to comply with the requirements of the STCW 95 convention.

For quality accreditation, the institute is a certified ISO-9001 institute. It complies with the Indian Government's Right to Information Act.

== Admissions ==
IMU Kolkata offers 246 seats for admission into the B.Tech. Marine Engineering program and 20 seats for the M.Tech. program and 15 for MBA program. Admissions to both the B.Tech. and M.Tech. programs are conducted through the IMU CET entrance examination. For M.Tech. admissions, GATE scores are also considered alongside IMU CET results.

Candidates applying for the B.Tech. program must have completed 10+2 with Physics, Chemistry, and Mathematics. The minimum age requirement is specified in the prospectus, with age relaxation for certain categories as mentioned.

== Infrastructure ==
The campus, spanning over 33 acres, is equipped with state-of-the-art infrastructure to support the academic and practical training of cadets. It includes a wide range of specialized laboratories, such as those for Mechanical Engineering, Hydraulics, Heat, Electronics, Electrical, Control Engineering, Boilers, Computers, MARPOL, Fire Fighting, Simulation, and Seamanship.

The institute also features a comprehensive technical library, stocked with an extensive collection of books, journals, videos, and periodicals to facilitate in-depth learning.

A well-equipped workshop houses advanced machinery, including a test rig, Allen 2-stroke engine, Yanmar engines, and operational models of ship machinery and components, offering cadets practical experience.

== Hostels ==
- Junior Hostel for 1st-year cadets.
- New Junior Hostel (currently under construction).

East Wing designated for 2nd-year cadets.

West Wing designated for 2nd-year cadets.

Outer Block Complex (OBC Hostel) for 3rd-year cadets.

L-Wing for final-year cadets.

Senior Hostel for final-year cadets.

Girls' Hostel for lady cadets.

M.Tech and MBA Hostel.

Residence on campus is compulsory, with separate hostels and dormitories for male and female cadets. Cadets are required to wear uniforms throughout their training.

== Notable alumni ==
Name	Position
Ranjit Singh	CEO of Essar Shipping
P.K. Banerjee	CEO and Country Manager of Lloyd's Register of Shipping (India and Sri Lanka)
Sanjay Dixit	Officer of the Indian Administrative Service; Principal Secretary to the Government of Rajasthan; Secretary General of the Rajasthan Cricket Association; member of the Finance Committee, BCCI
Yatin Gangla	COO of Thome Group
Hemant Singh Pathania	Managing Director and COO of NYK Ship Management; Corporate Officer of NYK Line
A.K. Gupta	Chairman and Managing Director of The Shipping Corporation of India
S. K. Gupta	Global Vice President of Operations at Lockheed Martin Space Systems Company (SSC)
Ravi Kumar Mehrotra	Marine engineer; founder of Foresight Limited; established the shuttle service for Iranian oil during the Iran/Iraq War; awarded Honorary CBE by Queen Elizabeth II in 2006
Ehsan Mesbahi	Served on the United Nations' Marine Environmental Protection Committee; Dean and CEO of Newcastle University International Singapore; founder and director of Newcastle University Marine International
Bala Subramaniam	Retired Executive Director of Adani Shipping Pte Ltd.; served the United Nations as Principal Adviser and Senior Maritime Specialist
B.S. Teeka	Founder of the Executive Group of companies; oversees a global organization with 12 offices and over 6000 employees
T. M. Vasudev	Former Director General of Shipping, Government of India
S. S. Rawat	Renowned marine engineer with extensive experience in maritime operations
M. K. Rathi	Worked with major shipping lines; known for contributions to maritime safety and engineering
R. K. Gupta	Marine engineer and consultant involved in high-profile maritime projects
S. K. Mishra	Marine engineer and consultant recognized for expertise in marine engineering and vessel management
A. P. Singh	Director of Marine Training at a major maritime organization; influential in maritime education and training
N. C. Sharma	Executive Director of a prominent maritime company; contributions to shipbuilding and management
R. C. Verma	Maritime expert and educator; worked extensively in maritime training and research
Dr. Rajoo Balaji	Pro Vice Chancellor of Indian Maritime University; graduated from Marine Engineering College, Kolkata; former Director of IMU Chennai Campus; expertise in Maritime Education and Marine Environment

== See also ==
- List of maritime colleges
- World Maritime University
- Naval architecture
- Marine propulsion
- Indian Institute of Technology
- Indian Maritime University
- CUET
- JEE-Main
- JEE-Advanced
