= JIS University =

University in India

- Motto: Education beyond ordinary
- Type: Private university
- Established: 2014
- Academic affiliations: UGC; AIU; AICTE; PCI; BCI; NCTE
- Budget: ₹15.052 crore (US$1.6 million) (FY2021–22 est.)
- Chancellor: Taranjit Singh
- Vice-Chancellor: Dr. Bhaskar Gupta
- Director: Sardar Simarpreet Singh
- Academic staff: 220 (2023)
- Students: 2,713 (2023)
- Undergraduates: 2,178 (2023)
- Postgraduates: 418 (2023)
- Doctoral students: 117 (2023)
- Location: Agarpara, West Bengal, India; 22°40′35″N 88°22′43″E
- Campus: Urban
- Colors: Blue and White
- Website: www.jisuniversity.ac.in

JIS University is a private university located near Agarpara, West Bengal, India It was established in 2014 under The JIS University Act, 2014 of West Bengal Legislative Assembly. JIS stands for Jodh Ishwar Singh, the founder of JIS Group, Sardar Jodh Singh and his brother Sardar Ishwar Singh. JIS University is a multi-disciplinary, unitary & affiliating university, offering courses in engineering, technology, sciences, humanities, law, medicine, pharmacy and management studies.

== Faculty ==
- List of Departments in JIS University
  - Faculty of Agriculture
  - Faculty of Education
  - Faculty of Engineering and Technology
  - Faculty of Hospitality and Hotel Administration
  - Faculty of Juridical Sciences
  - Faculty of Management
  - Faculty of Pharmacy
  - Faculty of Science
  - JIS Institute of Advanced Studies and Research
  - JIS School of Medical Science & Research

Ranking

JIS College of Engineering ranked between 201-300 band in NIRF 2024.
