= Amity University, Kolkata =

Private university in Kolkata, India

- Type: Private
- Established: 6 January 2015; 11 years ago
- Academic affiliations: UGC, AIU, BCI, AICTE
- Chancellor: Atul Chauhan
- Vice-Chancellor: Sanku Bose
- Location: New Town, Kolkata, West Bengal, India; 22°35′45.13″N 88°29′07.61″E
- Campus: Urban
- Colours: Blue & Yellow
- Website: amity.edu

Amity University, Kolkata is a private university in Kolkata in the state of West Bengal, India. It was founded in 2015 and is the eighth, university to be established by the Amity Education Group.

The Amity Group was established in Kolkata in 2009 with Amity Global Business School (Salt Lake, Sector V), which offered management degrees under Amity University. In 2015, the state legislature of West Bengal passed the Amity University Act, 2014 (West Bengal Act, XXIV of 2014)

University rankings

Law – India
- NIRF (2024): 39

Architecture – India
- NIRF (2024): 25
