= Sister Nivedita University =

University in India

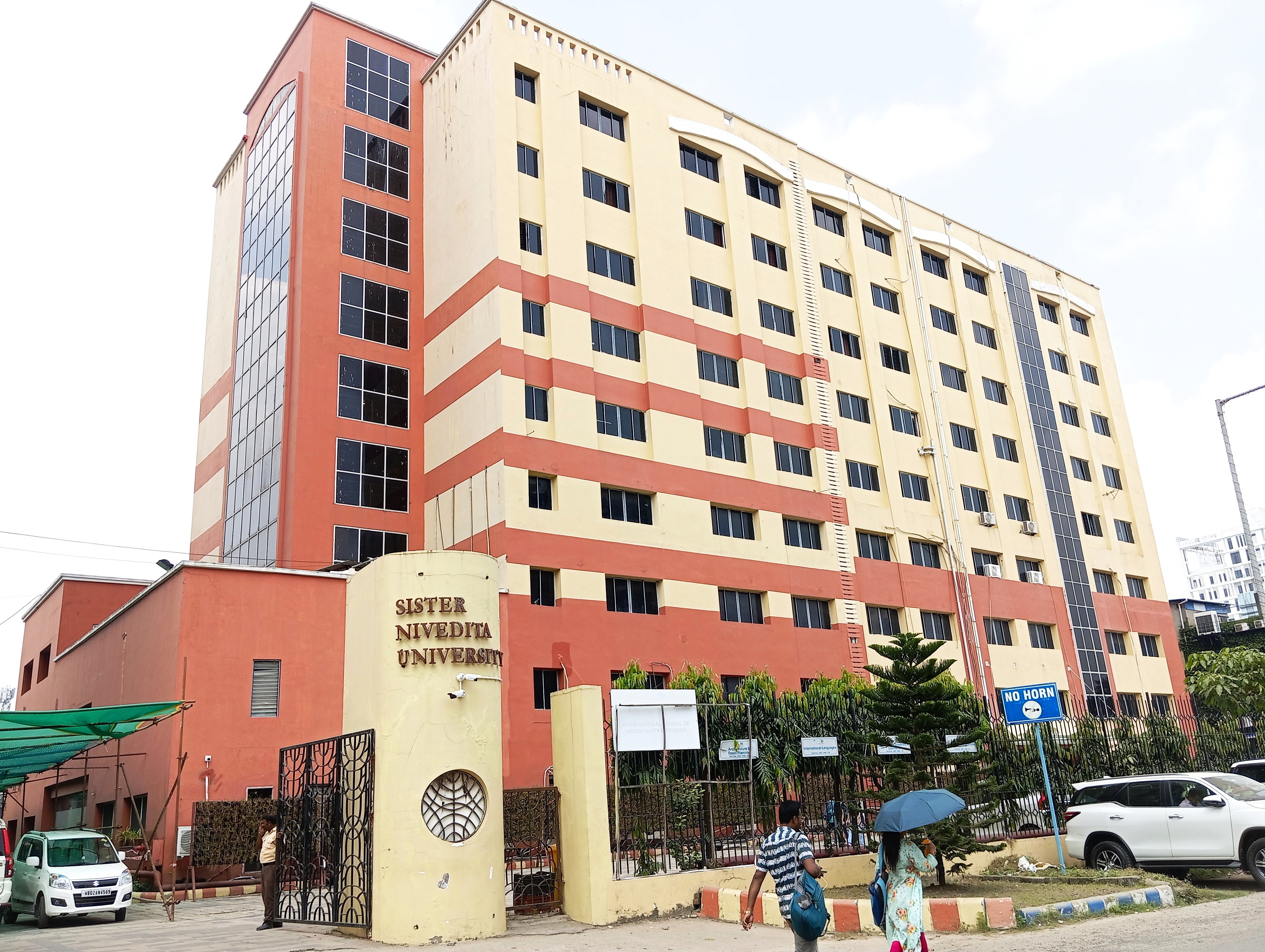
- Motto: Knowledge, Innovation, Excellence
- Type: Private
- Established: 2017
- Affiliations: UGC; AICTE; BCI; INC; PCI
- Chancellor: Satyam Roychowdhury
- Vice-Chancellor: Anupam Basu
- Location: New Town, Kolkata, West Bengal, India; 22.5790°N 88.4762°E
- Campus: Urban
- Website: snuniv.ac.in

Sister Nivedita University is a private university located in New Town, Kolkata. It was established by the Sister Nivedita University Act, 2017. It is named after Sister Nivedita, a disciple of Swami Vivekananda.. This University is a part of Techno India Group, a chain of colleges and schools all over the state. The university offers educational programs and research in a wide array of subjects, under disciplines like Engineering and Technology, Science, Medicine, Management, Law, Humanities, Language and Literature, Pharmacy, Architecture, Social Sciences, Performing Arts, Sports, Media, Design, etc.

== Accreditation ==
- University Grants Commission (UGC)
- All India Council for Technical Education (AICTE)
- Association of Indian Universities (AIU)
- National Academic Depository (NAD)
- Bar Council of India (BCI)
- Indian Nursing Council (INC)
- West Bengal Nursing Council (WBNC)
- Pharmacy Council of India (PCI)
- Council of Architecture (COA)
- All India Survey on Higher Education (AISHE)
- Institution’s Innovation Council (IIC)
- Department of Scientific and Industrial Research: Scientific and Industrial Research Organisations (DSIR - SIRO)

== Notable Achievement ==
=== University Achievements ===
The achievement of the University has been recognised by multiple prestigious houses. The University has been awarded with the title, Best Private University by Asian Education Awards in 2021; Best Global University in Eastern India by Zee 24 Ghanta; India’s Number 4, West Bengal’s Number 1 and Kolkata’s Number 1 University by Education World; The Best Emerging University by News 18 Bangla and Premier Private University Eastern India by Tutopia and Zee Media.

=== Departmental Achievements ===
Best Media School in India has been extended to the Sister Nivedita University School of Mass Communication and Journalism by Higher Education Review in 2021. Former Head of the Department of Mass Communication and Journalism, current Dean of School of Arts, Media and Design, Dr. Minal Pareek has been awarded with the Global Annual Research and Excellence Award 2021 for Academic Excellence in the field of Mass Communication and Journalism. Former Head of the Departments of Microbiology and Biotechnology, current Assistant Director of Biotechnology, Dr. Rajat Pal has been awarded with Best Biology Professor of the Year by Education Icon Award 2021; Dynamic Teacher of the Year by Indian Shiksha Awards 2021; Young Professor of the Year by Education Excellence Award 2021. Faculty of Department of Microbiology and Biotechnology, Dr. Atreyi Ghosh was awarded the Woman Excellence Award by the International society of Environmental Relationship and Sustainability. Current Head of the Department of Microbiology Dr. Fatema Calcuttawala was awarded the Young Scientist Award by International Scientist Awards 2021.

=== Student Achievements ===
- Sister Nivedita University students to represent the nation at BRICS Skills Competition 2025 in China.
- Sister Nivedita University students got selected for Sakura Science Prog in Japan.
- Sister Nivedita University helped take International Kolkata Bookfair have global reach by serving as the official digital media partner.
- Sister Nivedita University student creates mascots for 48th International Kolkata Bookfair.

== Infrastructure ==
- CRM and AI Skill Lab in collaboration with Salesforce
- Modern TV Studio
- VFX Lab
- Digital Radio Station
- Computer Lab
- Electronics Lab
- Communication Systems Lab
- Virtual Instrumentation and Signal Processing Lab
- Dynamics Lab
- Library
- Hostel
- Cafeteria
- Seminar Hall
- Auditorium

== Placement ==
The placement drive at Sister Nivedita University (SNU), Kolkata, for the Class of 2023 recorded a placement rate of 97%, with over 270 recruiters participating across various sectors. The highest package offered stood at ₹51 LPA, while the average package was ₹6.5 LPA. Prominent recruiters included major companies such as Amazon, Deloitte, EY, Infosys, Wipro, TCS, and IBM.
