= Directorate General of Shipping =

Indian government agency

- Company type: Government agency
- Industry: Maritime
- Founded: September 1949
- Headquarters: Mumbai, India
- Area served: India
- Key people: Shyam Jagannathan, Director General of Shipping
- Parent: Ministry of Ports, Shipping and Waterways
- Website: http://www.dgshipping.gov.in/

The Directorate General of Shipping, India is an attached office under the Ministry of Shipping, Government of India, responsible for life, health, vessel and the environment for Indian registered ships and ships at Indian ports. The Directorate, is located in Mumbai and led by Director General of Shipping Shri Shyam Jagannathan, IAS and Additional Secretary to the Government of India.

== Duties ==
The main job for the directorate is to ensure that Indian ships and shipping companies meet high safety- and environmental standards, to ensure that Indian seamen have high qualifications and good working- and living conditions, and to ensure that foreign ships in Indian territory and ports meet international rules.

The Director General of Shipping is vested with statutory powers under Section 7 of the Merchant Shipping Act, 1958, and is responsible for implementation of the provisions of the Act.

It ensures implementation of various international Conventions, relating to safely SOLAS, (International Convention for the Safety of Life at Sea) requirements for prevention of pollution, MARPOL 73/78 and other mandatory requirements of International Maritime Organization.

== Directors ==
Shri Shyam Jagannathan, is the current director of DG Shipping India, an IAS officer of the 1997 Assam-Meghalaya cadre. He is on central deputation since May 2021 and will serve as director at DG Shipping for three years.

== See also ==
- Borders of India
- Climate of India
- Coastal India
- Exclusive economic zone of India
- Fishing in India
- Outline of India
