= Techno India University =

Educational Institution in Kolkata

- Other name: TIU
- Type: Private
- Established: 2012; 14 years ago
- Accreditation: NAAC
- Academic affiliations: UGC; AICTE; COA; PCI; BCI; INC
- Chancellor: Goutam Roy Chowdhury
- Vice-Chancellor: Samiran Chattopadhyay
- Academic staff: 125
- Students: 3,456
- Location: EM-4, Sector V, Salt Lake City, West Bengal, India; 22°34′33″N 88°25′38″E
- Campus: Urban
- Colors: Red and white
- Website: www.technoindiauniversity.ac.in

Techno India University (TIU) is a private university in Kolkata, West Bengal, India. The university is known for being one of the first privately owned universities in West Bengal. The students of the university participate in various cultural and technical events across the city.

== History ==
In 2023, during the annual convocation event of the university that saw over 4500 students receive their degrees, NR Narayana Murthy, the chief guest for the convocation conferred an honorary doctorate in literature to Sushmita Sen.

== Controversies ==
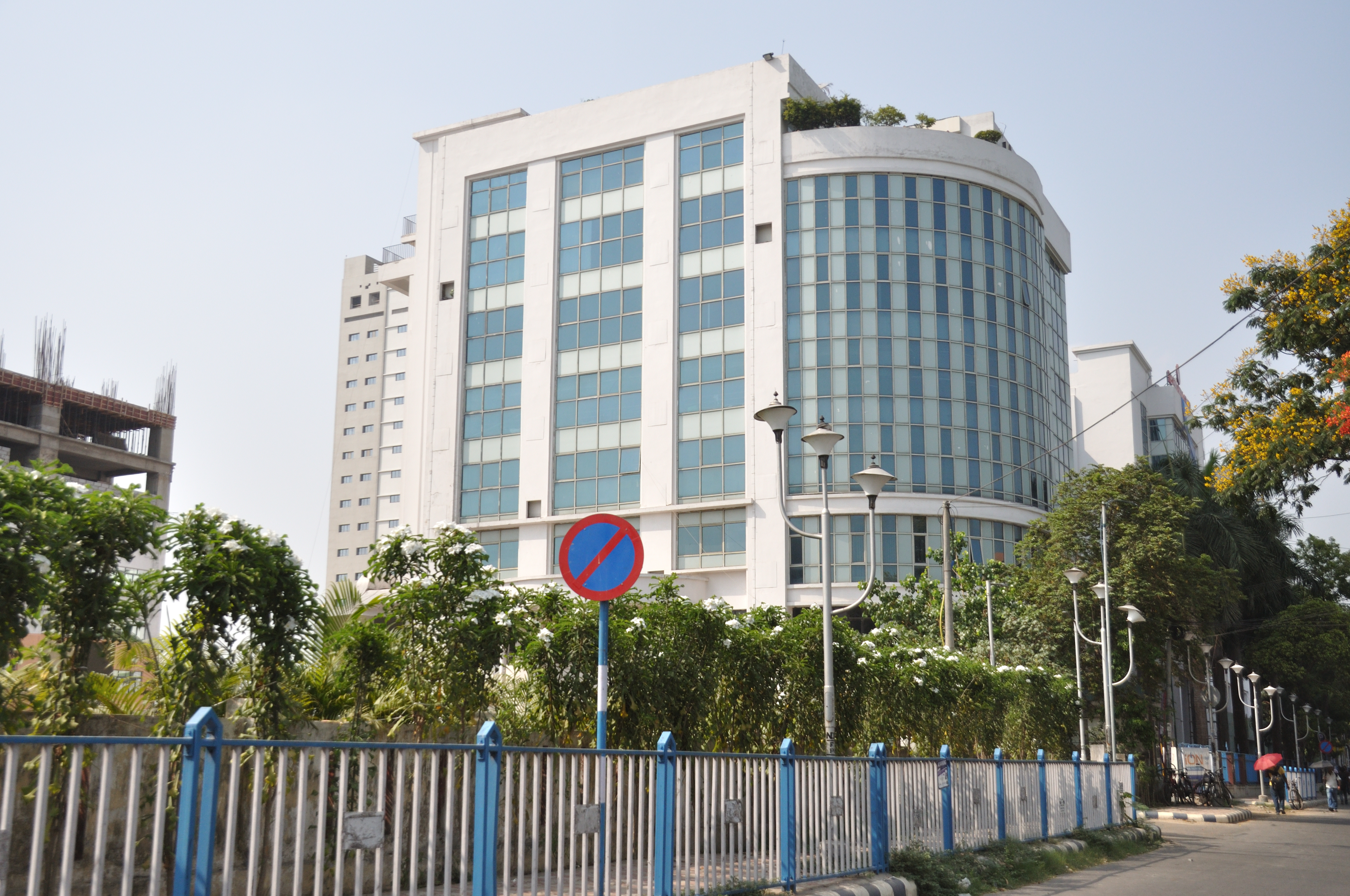
Techno India University

=== Ragging ===
In August 2017, a freshman student with Engineering major reported a ragging case with his parents. This matter was unveiled when ABP Ananda telecast the news.

=== Cheating and harassment ===
Also in 2017, widespread cheating at Techno India University was reported, as well as harassment of teachers who attempted to rectify the situation.

== See also ==
- List of institutions of higher education in West Bengal
- Education in India
- Education in West Bengal
