= List of maritime colleges =

List of maritime colleges worldwide

This is a list of maritime colleges, grouped by geographical region and country.

== Africa ==
Country	City	University	Notes	Ref
Algeria	Béjaïa	École Technique de Formation et d'Instruction Maritimes de Béjaia		
Algeria	Bou Ismaïl	École Nationale Supérieure Maritime		
Algeria	Mostaganem	École Technique de Formation et d'Instruction Maritimes de Mostaganem		
Egypt	Alexandria	Arab Academy for Science, Technology and Maritime Transport		
Eritrea	Massawa	Massawa College of Marine Science and Technology	Marine engineering department, 5-year programme	
Ethiopia	Bahir Dar	Ethiopian Maritime Training Institute		
Ghana	Accra	Regional Maritime University	Serves Anglophone countries such as Cameroon and Liberia	
Kenya	Mombasa	Bandari Maritime Academy		
Kenya	Juja	Jomo Kenyatta University of Agriculture and Technology		
Kenya	Mombasa	Maritime & Management Institute Of East Africa		
Kenya	Mombasa	Technical University of Mombasa	Satellite campuses in Kwale and Lamu	
Morocco	Agadir	Institut Supérieur des Pêches Maritimes d'Agadir		
Morocco	Al Hoceïma	Institut de Technologie des Pêches Maritimes		
Morocco	Casablanca	Institut Supérieur D'Etudes Maritimes		
Morocco	Larache	Institut de Technologie des Pêches Maritimes		
Morocco	Safi	Institut de Technologie des Pêches Maritimes		
Morocco	Tan-Tan	Institut de Technologie des Pêches Maritimes		
Mozambique	Maputo	Escola Superior de Ciências Náuticas		
Namibia	Walvis Bay	Namibian Maritime and Fisheries Institute		
Namibia	Windhoek	Namibia University of Science and Technology		
Nigeria	Bonny	Maritime Center of Excellence	Owned by NLNG Ship Management Limited	
Nigeria	Burutu	Delta State School of Marine Technology		
Nigeria	Benin City	University of Benin	Degree in Maritime Studies	
Nigeria	Etinan	Institute of Marine and Technology		
Nigeria	Eleekara	African Maritime Academy		
Nigeria	Ikeja	Merchant Navy Maritime Academy		
Nigeria	Lagos	Certified Institute of Shipping of Nigeria	Main campus	
Nigeria	Lagos	Crown Maritime Academy		
Nigeria	Lagos	Federal College of Fisheries and Marine Technology		
Nigeria	Okerenkoko	Nigeria Maritime University		
Nigeria	Oron	Maritime Academy of Nigeria		
Nigeria	Ota	Stars Maritime Academy		
Nigeria	Port Harcourt	Western Aviation and Marine Business Academy		
Nigeria	Port Harcourt	Charkin Maritime Academy		
Nigeria	Uwheru	Southern Maritime Academy		
Nigeria	Warri	Global Maritime Academy		
Nigeria	Warri	Joemarine Institute of Nautical Studies and Research		
South Africa	Cape Town	Cape Peninsula University of Technology		
South Africa	Cape Town	School of Shipping		
South Africa	Cape Town	Sea Safety Training Group		
South Africa	Cape Town	South African Maritime Training Academy		
South Africa	Durban	Durban University of Technology		
South Africa	Durban	SA Maritime School and Transport College		
South Africa	Durban	Transnet Maritime School of Excellence		
South Africa	Gqeberha	Nelson Mandela University		
South Africa	Gqeberha	South African International Maritime Institute		
Tanzania	Dar es Salaam	Dar es Salaam Maritime Institute		

== Americas ==
Country	City	University	Notes	Ref
Argentina	Buenos Aires	Escuela Nacional de Náutica Manuel Belgrano		
Brazil	Belém	Centro de Instrução Almirante Brás de Aguiar		
Brazil	Belém	Federal University of Pará	10 satellite campuses in Pará state	
Brazil	Rio de Janeiro	Centro de Instrução Almirante Graça Aranha		
Brazil	Rio de Janeiro	Centro Universitário Estadual da Zona Oeste		
Brazil	Rio de Janeiro	Escola Naval		
Brazil	Rio de Janeiro	Fundação de Estudos do Mar		
Brazil	Rio de Janeiro	Universidade Federal do Rio de Janeiro		
Brazil	São Paulo	Polytechnic School of the University of São Paulo		
Canada	Ladysmith	Western Maritime Institute		
Canada	North Vancouver	British Columbia Institute of Technology		
Canada	Owen Sound	Georgian College		
Canada	Port Hawkesbury	Nova Scotia Community College		
Canada	Quebec City	Virtual Maritime Academy	online	
Canada	Rimouski	Institut Maritime du Québec		
Canada	Université du Québec à Rimouski			
Canada	St. Andrews	New Brunswick Community College		
Canada	St. John's	Marine Institute of Memorial University of Newfoundland		
Canada	Summerside	Holland College		
Canada	Westmount	Canadian Coast Guard College		
Ecuador	Guayaquil	Universidad Del Pacífico		
Jamaica	Kingston	Caribbean Maritime University		
Mexico	Ciudad del Carmen	Centro de Educación Náutica de Campeche		
Mexico	Mazatlán	Escuela Náutica Mercante de Mazatlán		
Mexico	Tampico	Escuela Náutica Mercante de Tampico		
Mexico	Veracruz	Escuela Náutica Mercante de Veracruz		
Panama	Panama City	International Maritime University of Panama		
Peru	Callao	Escuela Nacional de Marina Mercante		
Trinidad and Tobago	Chaguaramas	University of Trinidad and Tobago		
United States	The Bronx	State University of New York Maritime College	State maritime academy	
United States	Buzzards Bay	Massachusetts Maritime Academy	State maritime academy	
United States	Castine	Maine Maritime Academy	State maritime academy	
United States	Fairhaven	Northeast Maritime Institute		
United States	Fort Lauderdale	Maritime Professional Training	Non-degree program; offers classes for professional licensure (e.g. USCG Captain's license).	
United States	Galveston	Texas A&M Maritime Academy	State maritime academy	
United States	Gloucester	Atlantis Maritime Academy		
United States	Houma	FMTC Safety Houma	Non-degree program; offers classes for professional certifications (e.g. OPITO, GWO, OSHA).	
United States	Houston	San Jacinto College Maritime Technology & Training Center		
United States	Ketchikan	University of Alaska Southeast Regional Maritime and Career Center		
United States	Key West	The College of the Florida Keys		
United States	Kings Point	United States Merchant Marine Academy	US service academy	
United States	Linthicum	Maritime Institute of Technology and Graduate Studies	Non-degree program; offers classes for professional licenses (e.g. 3rd Mate, Chief Mate, Master). Merged with Fremont Maritime Services.	
United States	Miramar	Broward College Marine Center of Excellence		
United States	Norfolk	Mid-Atlantic Maritime Academy	merged with Training Resources Maritime Institute. Penalized by USCG for unapproved courses.	
United States	Pennington	Mariners Learning System	Non-degree program; offers classes for professional licensure (e.g. USCG Captain's license). Online.	
United States	Piney Point	Paul Hall Center for Maritime Training and Education		
United States	San Diego	Training Resources Maritime Institute	merged with Mid-Atlantic Maritime Academy.	
United States	Seattle	Fremont Maritime Services	merged with Maritime Institute of Technology and Graduate Studies.	
United States	Seattle	Seattle Maritime Academy		
United States	Stuart	Chapman School of Seamanship		
United States	Tampa	MTC Maritime Training Center		
United States	Tampa	Gulf Coast Maritime Academy		
United States	Traverse City	Great Lakes Maritime Academy	State maritime academy. Part of Northwestern Michigan College.	
United States	Vallejo	Cal Poly Maritime Academy	State maritime academy	
Venezuela	La Guaira	Universidad Marítima del Caribe		

== Asia ==
Country	City	University	Notes	Ref
Azerbaijan	Baku	Azerbaijan State Marine Academy		
Bahrain	Isa Town	Bahrain Polytechnic		
Bangladesh	Chittagong	Bangladesh Marine Fisheries Academy		
Bangladesh	Chittagong	Marine Academy	Satellite campuses in Barisal, Pabna, Rangpur, and Sylhet	
Bangladesh	Chittagong	National Maritime Institute		
Bangladesh	Dhaka	Atlantic Maritime Academy		
Bangladesh	Dhaka	Bangladesh Maritime University	Main campus is in Chittagong	
Bangladesh	Dhaka	Bangladesh Maritime Training Institute		
Bangladesh	Dhaka	MariTime Institute of Science & Technology	Also a campus in Chittagong	
Bangladesh	Dhaka	National Institute of Engineering and Technology	Second campus in Narayanganj	
Bangladesh	Dhaka	Western Maritime Academy		
Bangladesh	Gazipur	International Maritime Academy		
Bangladesh	Narayanganj	Bangladesh Institute of Marine Technology		
Bangladesh	Salimpur	Ocean Maritime Academy		
Bangladesh	Uttara	Cambridge Maritime College	Also a campus in Dhaka	
China	Dalian	Dalian Maritime University	Associated with branches in Malmö and Shanghai	
China	Dalian	Dalian Ocean University		
China	Hainan	Hainan Tropical Ocean University		
China	Jiangsu	Jiangsu Maritime Institute		
China	Nanjing	Hohai University		
China	Qingdao	Ocean University of China		
China	Shanghai	Shanghai Maritime University	Associated with branches in Malmö and Dalian	
China	Shanghai	Shanghai Ocean University		
China	Wuhan	Wuhan University of Technology		
China	Xiamen	Jimei University		
China	Zhanjiang	Guangdong Ocean University		
China	Zhoushan	Zhejiang Ocean University		
Cyprus	Kyrenia	Girne American University		
Cyprus	Kyrenia	University of Kyrenia		
Georgia	Batumi	Batumi High Maritime Engineering School ANRI		
Georgia	Batumi	Batumi Navigation Teaching University		
Georgia	Batumi	Batumi State Maritime Academy		
Hong Kong	Hong Kong	Hong Kong Polytechnic University	Department of Logistics and Maritime Studies	
Hong Kong	Hong Kong	Maritime Services Training Institute		
India	Chennai	Academy of Maritime Education and Training		
India	Chennai	CMC Maritime Academy		
India	Chennai	Hindustan Institute of Maritime Training	Also has branche in Vizag	
India	Chennai	Indian Maritime University	Satellite campuses in Kochi, Kolkata, Mumbai Port, Navi Mumbai, and Visakhapatnam	
India	Chennai	International Maritime Academy	Affiliated with Annamalai University	
India	Chennai	National Institute of Ocean Technology		
India	Chennai	Vels Institute of Science, Technology & Advanced Studies		
India	Coimbatore	Coimbatore Marine College		
India	Diamond Harbour	Neotia Institute of Technology Management and Science		
India	Goa	Institute of Maritime Studies		
India	Goa	National Institute of Oceanography		
India	Greater Noida	International Maritime Institute		
India	Kochi	Kunjali Marakkar School of Marine Engineering		
India	Kochi	Central Institute of Fisheries Nautical and Engineering Training		
India	Kochi	Euro Tech Maritime Academy		
India	Kochi	Sree Narayana Gurukulam College of Engineering		
India	Kasinayagampatti	Sri Nandhanam Maritime Academy		
India	Koba	Gujarat Maritime University	Associated with Gujarat National Law University	
India	Kolkata	Institute of Technology and Marine Engineering		
India	Kolkata	Marine Engineering and Research Institute	Also has a campus in Mumbai	
India	Kolkata	Neotia University		
India	Kollam	Kerala Maritime Institute		
India	Lonavala	Great Eastern Institute of Maritime Studies		
India	Lonavala	Samundra Institute of Maritime Studies	Affiliated with Indian Maritime University	
India	Mangalore	Mangalore Marine College		
India	Mumbai	Anglo Eastern Maritime Training Centre	Conducts post sea STCW courses and is a pioneer in Continuous Professional development courses	
India	Karjat	Anglo Eastern Maritime Academy	Affiliated to Indian Maritime University and conducts Pre-Sea training for Deck Cadets, Marine Engineering Cadets and Electro-technical trainee officers.	
India	Navi Mumbai	AIMS Institute of Maritime Studies		
India	Navi Mumbai	B.P. Marine Academy		
India	New Delhi	Capt. S S S Rewari Foundation School of Maritime Studies		
India	New Delhi	Anglo Eastern Maritime Training Centre	Conducts post sea STCW courses and is a pioneer in Continuous Professional development courses	
India	Panapakkam	Southern Academy of Maritime Studies		
India	Pondicherry	Pondicherry Maritime Academy		
India	Pune	Maharashtra Academy of Naval Education and Training		
India	Pune	Tolani Maritime Institute		
India	Pune	Vishwakarma Maritime Institute		
India	Sewri	Lal Bahadur Shastri College of Advanced Maritime Studies and Research		
India	Thisayanvilai	Jeyanthinather Academy of Marine Studies		
India	Visakhapatnam	Andhra University College of Engineering	Extension of Andhra University	
Indonesia	Batam	SMK Pelayaran Nasional Batam		
Indonesia	Cilacap Regency	Akademi Maritim Nusantara		
Indonesia	Jakarta	Akademi Maritim Djadajat		
Indonesia	Jakarta	Sekolah Tinggi Ilmu Pelayaran Jakarta		
Indonesia	Karang Serang	Politeknik Pelayaran Banten		
Indonesia	Makassar	Akademi Maritim Indonesia		
Indonesia	Makassar	Politeknik Ilmu Pelayaran Makassar		
Indonesia	Mesjid Raya	Politeknik Pelayaran Malahayati		
Indonesia	Purwokerto	SMK - SPM Nasional Purwokerto		
Indonesia	Surabaya	Politeknik Pelayaran Surabaya		
Indonesia	Ulakan Tapakis	Politeknik Pelayaran Sumatera Barat		
Indonesia	Semarang	Politeknik Maritim Negeri Indonesia		
Indonesia	Semarang	Politeknik Ilmu Pelayaran Semarang		
Indonesia	Semarang	Universitas Maritim AMNI Semarang		
Indonesia	Sorong	Politeknik Pelayaran Sorong		
Iran	Bandar Abbas	University of Hormozgan		
Iran	Bandar Abbas	Amirkabir University of Technology	Main campus is in Tehran	
Iran	Bushehr	Persian Gulf University		
Iran	Chabahar	Chabahar Maritime University		
Iran	Khorramshahr	Khorramshahr University of Marine Science and Technology		
Iran	Mahmudabad	Petroleum University of Technology		
Iran	Nowshahr	Imam Khomeini Naval University of Noshahr		
Iran	Shahin Shahr	Malek-Ashtar University of Technology	Main campus is in Tehran	
Iran	Tehran	IRISL Maritime Training Institute	Owned by IRISL Group	
Iraq	Basra	Arabian Gulf Academy For Maritime Studies		
Israel	Acre	The Marine Institute		
Japan	Ashiya	Marine Technical College		
Japan	Kobe	Kobe University		
Japan	Kure	Japan Coast Guard Academy		
Japan	Onomichi	Onomichi Marine Tech Test Center		
Japan	Ōsakikamijima	Hiroshima National College of Maritime Technology		
Japan	Shizuoka	Tokai University		
Japan	Suō-Ōshima	Oshima National College of Maritime Technology		
Japan	Toba	Toba National College of Maritime Technology		
Japan	Tokyo	Tokyo University of Marine Science and Technology		
Japan	Toyama	Toyama National College of Maritime Technology		
Japan	Yuge	Yuge National College of Maritime Technology		
Jordan	Amman	Jordan Academy for Maritime Studies		
Jordan	Aqaba	Aqaba Centre Maritime Education and Training	Associated with Al-Balqaʼ Applied University	
Kazakhstan	Almaty	Kazakh-British Technical University		
Lebanon	Kaslik	International Maritime Academy		
Lebanon	Tripoli	City University of Tripoli		
Malaysia	Chukai	Ranaco Education & Training Institute		
Malaysia	Ipoh	Ungku Omar Polytechnic		
Malaysia	Iskandar Puteri	Universiti Teknologi Malaysia		
Malaysia	Johor Bahru	Netherlands Maritime University College		
Malaysia	Kuala Nerus District	Universiti Malaysia Terengganu		
Malaysia	Kuala Sungai Baru	Malaysian Maritime Academy	Owned by MISC Berhad	
Malaysia	Ligamas	Pelita Akademi		
Malaysia	Lumut	Universiti Kuala Lumpur Malaysian Institute of Marine Engineering Technology		
Myanmar	Thanlyin	Myanmar Maritime University		
Myanmar	Yangon	Brilliance Maritime Training Centre		
Myanmar	Yangon	Myanmar Excellent Stars - Maritime Training Institute		
Oman	Sohar	International Maritime College		
Pakistan	Karachi	Maritime Training Institute		
Pakistan	Karachi	Pakistan Marine Academy		
Pakistan	Karachi	Pakistan Navy School of Logistics and Management		
Philippines	Bacolod	VMA Global College		
Philippines	Barangay Tiwi	Iloilo State College of Fisheries	Other campuses in Barotac Nuevo, Dingle, Dumangas, and San Enrique	
Philippines	Batangas City	Lyceum of the Philippines University		
Philippines	Biñan	University of Perpetual Help System Laguna		
Philippines	Cabanatuan	Midway Maritime Foundation		
Philippines	Cabugao	Iloilo Merchant Marine School		
Philippines	Cabuyao	MCL Mapúa-PTC College of Maritime Education and Training		
Philippines	Cagayan de Oro	Capitol University		
Philippines	Cagayan de Oro	Southern de Oro Philippines College		
Philippines	Calasiao	Philippine College of Science and Technology		
Philippines	Calamba	NYK-TDG Maritime Academy		
Philippines	Carigara	Eastern Visayas State University	Main campus is in Tacloban	
Philippines	Cebu	Cebu Technological University		
Philippines	Cebu	SWU Maritime Regiment		
Philippines	Cebu	University of Cebu		
Philippines	Dagupan	Lyceum-Northwestern University		
Philippines	Dagupan	Pangasinan Merchant Marine Academy		
Philippines	Dasmariñas	MOL Magsaysay Maritime Academy		
Philippines	Davao City	Holy Cross of Davao College		
Philippines	Estancia	Northern Iloilo State University		
Philippines	General Santos	Mindanao Polytechnic College		
Philippines	Iloilo City	Iloilo Science and Technology University		
Philippines	Iloilo City	John B. Lacson Foundation Maritime University		
Philippines	Iloilo City	University of Iloilo		
Philippines	Iloilo City	Western Institute of Technology		
Philippines	Las Piñas	Philippine Merchant Marine School		
Philippines	Legazpi City	Mariners' Polytechnic Colleges Foundation		
Philippines	Manila	FEATI University		
Philippines	Manila	PMI Colleges	Other campuses in Quezon City and Tagbilaran	
Philippines	Manila	STI-NAMEI		
Philippines	Manila	United Marine Training Centre		
Philippines	Mariveles	Maritime Academy of Asia and the Pacific		
Philippines	Muntinlupa	West Bay College		
Philippines	Naval	Biliran Province State University Naval Institute of Technology		
Philippines	Olongapo	Central Luzon College of Science and Technology		
Philippines	Ozamiz	Misamis Institute of Technology		
Philippines	Ozamiz	Misamis University		
Philippines	Palompon	Palompon Institute of Technology		
Philippines	Panglao	Cristal e-College		
Philippines	Pasay	Asian Institute of Maritime Studies		
Philippines	Quezon City	PNTC Colleges	Other campuses in Dasmariñas, Intramuros, and Tanza	
Philippines	Quezon City	Technological Institute of the Philippines		
Philippines	San Narciso	Philippine Merchant Marine Academy		
Philippines	Sibalom	University of Antique College of Maritime Studies		
Philippines	Sorsogon City	Bicol Merchant Marine College Academy		
Philippines	Surigao City	Surigao Education Center		
Philippines	Talibon	BIT International College		
Philippines	Tigbauan	St. Therese	Marine courses also available at Magdalo. Main campus is in Iloilo City	
Philippines	Tuguegarao	University of Cagayan Valley		
Philippines	Urdaneta	Panpacific University		
Philippines	Valenzuela	Our Lady of Fatima University		
Russia	Vladivostok	Maritime State University		
South Korea	Busan	Korea Maritime and Ocean University		
South Korea	Mokpo	Mokpo National Maritime University		
Saudi Arabia	Jeddah	King Abdulaziz University		
Seychelles	Providence	Seychelles Maritime Academy		
Singapore	Jurong West	Nanyang Technological University		
Singapore	Queenstown	National University of Singapore		
Singapore	Singapore	Singapore Institute of Technology		
Singapore	Singapore	Singapore Polytechnic		
Turkmenistan	Turkmenbashi	Turkmenbashi Maritime Secondary Vocational School		
Turkmenistan	Turkmenabat River Secondary Special School			
Sri Lanka	Colombo	Mahapola Training Institute	Overseen by the Sri Lanka Ports Authority	
Sri Lanka	Colombo	Ocean University of Sri Lanka		
Sri Lanka	Diyagama	Institute of Technology, University of Moratuwa		
Sri Lanka	Kandy	Rainbow World Maritime Training Center		
Sri Lanka	Katunayake	Institute of Engineering Technology		
Sri Lanka	Malabe	Colombo International Nautical and Engineering College		
Sri Lanka	Moratuwa	Lanka Academy of Technological Studies		
Sri Lanka	Trincomalee	Naval and Maritime Academy		
Taiwan	Kaohsiung	National Kaohsiung University of Science and Technology		
Taiwan	Keelung	National Taiwan Ocean University		
Taiwan	Sizihwan	National Sun Yat-sen University		
Taiwan	Taipei	Taipei University of Marine Technology		
Thailand	Bangkok	Merchant Marine Training Center		
Thailand	Chonburi	Asian Maritime Technological College		
Thailand	Pak Nam Samut Prakan	Alex Maritime & Technical College		
Thailand	Phuket	Maritime Education Services		
Thailand	Si Racha district	Kasetsart University		
Turkey	İskenderun	Iskenderun Technical University		
Turkey	Istanbul	Piri Reis University		
Turkey	Konyaaltı	Akdeniz University		
Turkey	Rize	Recep Tayyip Erdoğan University		
Turkey	Sürmene	Karadeniz Technical University	Naval Architecture is offered on the main campus in Trabzon	
Turkey	Van	Van Yüzüncü Yıl University		
Turkey	Zonguldak	Zonguldak Bülent Ecevit University		
United Arab Emirates	Sharjah	Sharjah Maritime Academy		
Vietnam	Haiphong	Vietnam Maritime University		

== Europe ==
Country	City	University	Notes	Ref
Albania	Durrës	Aleksandër Moisiu University of Durrës		
Albania	Vlorë	Ismail Qemali University of Vlorë		
Belgium	Antwerp	Antwerp Maritime Academy	degree offered in Dutch or French	
Belgium	Antwerp	CVO Antwerpen	course offered in Dutch	
Bulgaria	Varna	Nikola Vaptsarov Naval Academy		
Bulgaria	Varna	Technical University of Varna		
Croatia	Dubrovnik	University of Dubrovnik		
Croatia	Rijeka	University of Rijeka		
Croatia	Split	University of Split		
Croatia	Zadar	University of Zadar		
Denmark	Aarhus	Aarhus School of Marine and Technical Engineering		
Denmark	Copenhagen	Copenhagen School of Marine Engineering and Technology Management		
Denmark	Fredericia	Fredericia College of Marine and Technical Engineering	Campuses also in Esbjerg and Sønderborg	
Denmark	Marstal	Marstal Navigationsskole		
Denmark	Svendborg	Svendborg International Maritime Academy		
Estonia	Tallinn	Estonian Maritime Academy	Part of Tallinn University of Technology; two other centres in Saaremaa	
Estonia	Tallinn	Estonian Nautical School		
Faroe Islands	Tórshavn	Centre of Maritime Studies and Engineering		
Finland	Åland	Högskolan på Åland		
Finland	Kotka	Kymenlaakso University of Applied Sciences		
Finland	Rauma	Satakunta University of Applied Sciences		
Finland	Turku	Novia University of Applied Sciences		
France	Le Havre	École nationale supérieure maritime		
Germany	Bremen	City University of Applied Sciences		
Germany	Elsfleth	Jade University of Applied Sciences	Other campuses in Wilhelmshaven and Oldenburg	
Germany	Leer	Hochschule Emden/Leer		
Germany	Flensburg	Flensburg University of Applied Sciences		
Germany	Wismar	Hochschule Wismar		
Germany	Hamburg	Hamburg University of Technology	Institute for Maritime Logistics	
Greece	Aigaleo	University of West Attica		
Greece	Athens	National Technical University of Athens		
Greece	Ermoupoli	Merchant Marine Academy	Other campuses are in Argostoli, Attica, Chios, Crete, Hydra, Kalymnos, Kymi, Nea Michaniona, Oinousses, Preveza, and Syros	
Greece	Mytilene	University of the Aegean		
Greece	Piraeus	ALS Hellenic Maritime Training Center		
Greece	Piraeus	Cosmos Nautical Training Centre		
Greece	Piraeus	GMC Maritime Center		
Greece	Piraeus	Hellenic Naval Academy		
Greece	Piraeus	SQLearn E-learning	online	
Greece	Piraeus	Dimosies sxoles emporikou Naytikou		
Greece	Piraeus	University of Piraeus		
Ireland	Ringaskiddy	National Maritime College of Ireland		
Italy	Genoa	University of Genoa		
Italy	Genoa	Italian Academy of the Merchant Marine (Italian Shipping Academy)		
Italy	Livorno	Italian Naval Academy		
Italy	Naples	Parthenope University of Naples		
Italy	Pisa	University of Pisa Naval Academy		
Italy	Trieste	University of Trieste		
Latvia	Liepāja	Liepāja Maritime College		
Latvia	Riga	Latvian Maritime Academy		
Latvia	Riga	Novikontas Training Center		
Lithuania	Klaipėda	Klaipėda University		
Lithuania	Klaipėda	Lithuanian Maritime Academy		
Malta	Paola	Malta College of Arts, Science and Technology		
Montenegro	Kotor	University of Montenegro		
Netherlands	Amsterdam	Hogeschool van Amsterdam		
Netherlands	Den Helder	ROC Kop van Noord-Holland	Other campus in Urk	
Netherlands	Enkhuizen	Enkhuizer zeevaartschool		
Netherlands	Farmsum	Noorderpoort, Energy & Maritime		
Netherlands	Harlingen	Nova College Maritiem	Other campus in IJmuiden	
Netherlands	Rotterdam	Netherlands Maritime University Rotterdam; Master Shipping and Transport		
Netherlands	Rotterdam	STC Group	Other campuses in Katwijk aan Zee and Stellendam	
Netherlands	Terschelling	Maritime Institute Willem Barentsz		
Netherlands	Vlissingen	HZ University of Applied Sciences		
Netherlands	Vlissingen	Maritiem en Logistiek College De Ruyter		
Zwolle	Deltion College			
Norway	Ålesund	Ålesund University College		
Norway	Borre	Vestfold University College		
Norway	Haugesund	Stord/Haugesund University College		
Norway	Tromsø	University of Tromsø		
Poland	Gdynia	Gdynia Maritime University		
Poland	Szczecin	Maritime University of Szczecin		
Portugal	Oeiras	Escola Superior Náutica Infante Dom Henrique		
Romania	Constanța	Constanta Maritime University		
Romania	Constanța	Mircea cel Bătrân Naval Academy		
Romania	Constanța	Romanian Nautical College		
Romania	Galați	University of Galați		
Russia	Astrakhan	Astrakhan State Technical University		
Russia	Kaliningrad	Baltic Fishing Fleet State Academy		
Russia	Novorossiysk	Admiral Ushakov Maritime State University		
Russia	St. Petersburg	Admiral Makarov State Maritime Academy		
Russia	St. Petersburg	State University of Waterways Communication		
Slovenia	Ljubljana	University of Ljubljana		
Spain	A Coruña	Escuela Técnica Superior de Náutica y Máquinas		
Spain	Barcelona	Polytechnic University of Catalonia		
Spain	Cádiz	Escuela de Ingenierías Marina, Náutica y Radioelectrónica	Through the University of Cádiz	
Spain	Gijón	Escuela Superior de la Marina Civil de Gijón		
Spain	Madrid	Escuela Técnica Superior de Ingenieros Navales	Through Universidad Politécnica de Madrid	
Spain	Portugalete	Nautika eta Itsasontzi Makineria	Through University of the Basque Country	
Spain	Santa Cruz de Tenerife	Escuela Técnica Superior de Náutica, Máquinas y Radioelectrónica Naval	Through the University of La Laguna	
Spain	Santander	Escuela Técnica Superior de Náutica		
Sweden	Gothenburg	Chalmers University of Technology		
Sweden	Kalmar	Linnaeus University Kalmar Maritime Academy		
Sweden	Malmö	World Maritime University	Associated with branches in Shanghai and Dalian	
Turkey	Istanbul	Piri Reis University		
Turkey	Istanbul	Yıldız Technical University		
Turkey	Istanbul	Istanbul Technical University		
Turkey	İzmir	Dokuz Eylül University		
Turkey	Trabzon	Karadeniz Technical University		
Ukraine	Odesa	Odesa Maritime Academy	Has associated institutes in Mariupol and Izmail.	
Ukraine	Odesa	Odesa National Maritime University		
Ukraine	Kherson	Kherson State Maritime Academy		
Ukraine	Kyiv	Kyiv Institute of Water Transport		
Ukraine	Sevastopol	First Ukrainian maritime institute		
United Kingdom	Coleraine	Ulster University at Coleraine		
United Kingdom	Cranfield	Cranfield University		
United Kingdom	Cullercoats	Newcastle University	Located in the Dove Marine Laboratory	
United Kingdom	Edinburgh	Edinburgh College		
United Kingdom	Fleetwood	Fleetwood Nautical Campus	Part of the Blackpool and The Fylde College	
United Kingdom	Glasgow	City of Glasgow College		
United Kingdom	Glasgow	University of Strathclyde		
United Kingdom	Gravesend	National Maritime Training Centre	Overseen by North Kent College	
United Kingdom	Kirkwall	Orkney College		
United Kingdom	Liverpool	Liverpool John Moores University		
United Kingdom	London	Greenwich Maritime Centre	Part of the University of Greenwich	
United Kingdom	London	Institute of Marine Engineering, Science and Technology		
United Kingdom	London	The Marine Society College of the Sea		
United Kingdom	Peterhead	Scottish Maritime Academy	Overseen by North East Scotland College	
United Kingdom	Plymouth	University of Plymouth		
United Kingdom	Plymouth	MLA College		
United Kingdom	South Tyneside	South Tyneside College		
United Kingdom	Southampton	Boldrewood Innovation Campus	Part of University of Southampton	
United Kingdom	Southampton	Warsash Maritime School	Other campus in Warsash; part of Solent University	
United Kingdom	Stornoway	Lews Castle College		
Wotton-under-Edge	South West Maritime Academy			

== Oceania ==
Country	City	University	Notes	Ref
Australia	Fremantle	South Metropolitan TAFE	Campuses in Armadale, Bentley, Carlisle, Murdoch, Jandakot, Kwinana, Munster, Naval Base, Thornlie, Rockingham, and Mandurah	
Australia	Launceston	Australian Maritime College	Other campus in Beauty Point	
Australia	Legana	Pivot Maritime International		
Australia	Mountain Creek	Sunshine Coast Institute of TAFE	Campuses in Manbour, Maroochydore, Mooloolaba, Noosa, and Caloundra	
Australia	Murarrie	ECA Maritime College		
Australia	Newcastle	TAFE NSW		
Australia	Perth	Swan Maritime Institute Foundation		
Australia	Sprent	Briar Maritime Service		
Australia	Winnellie	Seafood & Maritime Industries Training		
Fiji	Suva	Fiji Maritime Academy		
French Polynesia	Papeete	École de formation et d'apprentissage maritime de la Polynésie française		
Kiribati	Betio	Marine Training Centre		
Kiribati	Tarawa	Kiribati Fisheries Training Centre		
Marshall Islands	Majuro	Marshall Islands Fisheries and Nautical Training Centre		
Micronesia	Yap Islands	College of Micronesia-FSM		
New Zealand	Auckland	Manukau Institute of Technology		
New Zealand	Nelson	Nelson Marlborough Institute of Technology	Part of the International Maritime Institute of New Zealand	
New Zealand	Warkworth	MIT Mahurangi		
New Caledonia	Nouméa	École des métiers de la mer		
Papua New Guinea	Kavieng	National Fisheries College		
Papua New Guinea	Madang	Papua New Guinea Maritime College		
Samoa	Apia	National University of Samoa		
Solomon Islands	Honiara	Honiara Solomon Islands College of Higher Education		
Tonga	Nukuʻalofa	Tonga Maritime Polytechnic Institute		
Tuvalu	Funafuti	Tuvalu Maritime Training Institute		
Vanuatu	Luganville	National University of Vanuatu Maritime College		

== See also ==
- Seafarer's professions and ranks
- Deck department
- Engine department
- Steward's department
- Marine propulsion
- STCW Convention
