= Escola de Formação de Oficiais da Marinha Mercante =

Brazilian military academy

Merchant Marine Officer Training School
- Escola de Formação de Oficiais da Marinha Mercante
- Other name: EFOMM
- Motto: Universidade do Mar
- Motto in English: University of the Sea
- Type: University-level military academy
- Established: 1980; 46 years ago
- Affiliations: Diretoria de Portos e Costas
- Location: Brazil
- Website: www.marinha.mil.br/ciaga/aefomm

The Merchant Marine Officers Training School (Portuguese: Escola de Formação de Oficiais da Marinha Mercante, EFOMM) is a military higher education institution, managed by the Brazilian Navy and maintained with resources from the Merchant Marine Fund. EFOMM serves as a reference center of the International Maritime Organization for the training of Merchant Marine Officers for the South American region.

In Brazil, there are two sister schools maintained by the Brazilian Navy, one being at the Centro de Instrução Almirante Graça Aranha (CIAGA), in Rio de Janeiro, and the other at the Centro de Instrução Almirante Brás de Aguiar (CIABA), in Belém, Pará.

== History ==
By decision of the Brazilian Government, the most appropriate solution for the formation of qualified personnel was given to the Navy, through the Directorate of Ports and Coasts (Portuguese: Diretoria de Portos e Costas, DPC), which became responsible for the technical-professional education of all seamen, including the subordinate personnel that until then did not have a school for their apprenticeship.

In 1980, the Navy Reserve Officers' Training Center (Portuguese: Núcleo de Formação de Oficiais da Reserva da Marinha, NFORM) was created, with the main task of providing EFOMM students with the necessary instruction for training to perform military functions. Since then, through EFOMM, it has been training Officers, updating and improving them in the various phases of their careers, and offering a vast program of special courses to all seafarers.

== Admission ==
In addition to requiring a high school education, to be eligible to enter the academy a candidate must:

- Be at least 17 years of age, and must not have passed their 23rd birthday before January 1 in the year of entrance.
- Be a citizen of Brazil, either by birth or naturalization.
- Meet the physical, security, and character requirements necessary for appointment as midshipman in the Brazilian Navy.
- Qualify academically.

Medical/Physical Clearance – Candidates are required to pass a physical test (Portuguese: Teste de Suficência Física, TSF), it is to pass the physical evaluation made by the Navy Health Directorate (DSM) known as Psychophysical Selection (Portuguese: Seleção Psicofísica, SP).

== Curriculum ==
The following academic programs (Bachelor of Science 3-year degree programs) are offered at EFOMM:

- B.Sc. in Maritime Studies (Portuguese: Oficial de Náutica da Marinha Mercante, FONT)
- B.Sc. in Marine machines engineering (Portuguese: Oficial de Máquinas da Marinha Mercante, FOMQ)

The course has two periods and is developed in eight semesters, as follows:

- Academic Period, consisting of six academic semesters in a semi-boarding regime, with exclusive dedication of the student and structured in an annual serial system, divided into two semesters; and
- Internship Period, comprising two semesters on board for the Nautical course and two semesters on board for the Engineering course, with supervised internship.

During the academic semesters, the students are military personnel in the rank of Midshipman, as provided in the military statute, because they are performing the Navy Reserve Officers Training. After the end of the third year, the student will be named Nautical or Machinery Practitioner (PON/POM), will carry out the Internship Program (Portuguese: Programa de Estágio, PREST), on board merchant vessels used in maritime navigation and maritime support, exclusively in companies indicated by the Instruction Centers.

After being declared second officer, the students are discharged from the active service of the Brazilian Navy, included as a second lieutenant in the Brazilian Navy Reserve Officer Corps, according to the legislation. As civilian students, they are governed by the Rules of Professional Maritime Education (Portuguese: Normas do Ensino Profissional Marítimo, EMP) and the internal rules of the Instruction Centers.

== See also ==
- List of maritime colleges
