= Uido Truija =

Estonian lawyer and writer (born 1944)

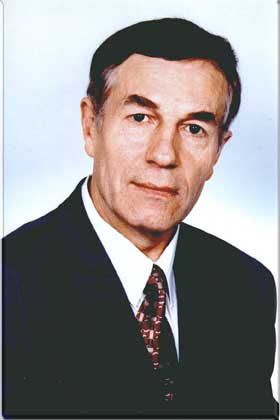

Uido Truija (born 22 February 1944) is an Estonian lawyer and writer.

== Early life and education ==
Truija was born in Vastseliina, Võrumaa, and graduated from Tallinn Maritime School as a shipmaster. He studied law at Moscow Juridical Distance Learning Institute in the faculty of law.

== Career ==
Truija has sailed seas from Arctic to Antarctic; has been engaged in Soviet Union's state-organized fish poaching on the coast of West Africa and in Antarctic waters; has given a practical short course on building socialism in Angola, Mauritania and several other African countries; acquainted with the construction of socialism with a "human face" in China and modest capitalism in Argentina. He was a sailor-cadet of the upper and lower foremast of the barcantine of the educational sailing ship "Vega" of the Tallinn Maritime School, 1st class driver (ambulance), 1st class diver, 1class lawyer, military intelligence (GRU) driver of the headquarters of the Moscow military district. Sailed on the cruise ship "Raketa" with underwater wings as a helmsman on the beautiful river Emajõgi on the Tartu - Pihkva route. Senior engineer of the Tallinn Sailing regatta of the 1980 Olympic Games in Moscow. He was the chief lawyer of the foreign tourism of the Estonian SSR, worked as a prosecutor and lawyer. He has taken part in the restoration of capitalism in Estonia, organising banks, companies, tourism operators, industry and political parties, privatization and expropriation figures and advised bankruptcy masters, advised hospitals and relations with the Health Insurance Fund and the Health Board.

== Works by Uido Truija ==
- Eesti aastal 2044 (Estonia in the year 2044, 1994)
- Elu planeedil Maa (Life on Planet Earth, 2001)
- Vanad roomlased Tallinnas (Old Romans in Tallinn, 2002)
- Liivimaa neitsi (Maiden of Livonia, 2004)
- Popullo (2005)
- Kurzeme printsess (Princess of Kurzeme, 2006)
- Idataevasse kerkib Veevalaja (Aquarius Rises to the Eastern Sky, 2008)
- Meresoolased huuled (Sea Salty Lips, 2008)
- Meresoolased huuled. Teine raamat (Sea Salty Lips. Second book, 2009)
- Meresoolased huuled. Kolmas raamat (Sea Salty Lips. Third book, 2010)
- Pisaraterajal huika mind videvikusorrina, mu arm (On a Trail of Tears Hoot Me as a Night Hawk, My Love, 2010)
- Kui võim läheb hulluks (When Power Goes Mad, 2012)
- Оплеуха человечеству (Slap in the Face of Mankind, 1999)
- Geopoliitiline katastroof (Geopolitical Catastrophe, 2014)
- Emotsioonide vang (Imprisoned by Emotions, 1999)
- Mul suri koer ära (My Dog is Dead, 2014)
- Lubadus (Promise. A Short Story à la Chekhov, 2014)
- Sotsialistlik seaduslikkus ja armastus (The Socialist Legality and Love. A short story, 2014)
- Punane terror valgub üle riigipiiri (Red Terror Spills Across the State Border, 2015)
- Luulehelbed. Luuletused Uido Truija teostest 2005-2015. ("Flakes of Poetry". Poems from the works of Uido Truija 2005 - 2015)
- "Taevatee haigla langeb koomasse" (The Hospital of Heaven's Path Falls Into a Coma, 2017)
- "Eesti presidendi teekond" (The Route of the Estonian President). Ooper "Vangidele videvik, Stalinile koidupuna (Opera "Twilight for Prisoners, Dawn for Stalin"), 2018
- "Eesti Vabariigi presidendi Konstantin Pätsi vanglapäevik" (Konstantin Päts, President of the Republic of Estonia. A Prison Diary 2019)
- "Kangelasliku Seltsimees Majori juhtumised KGB teenistuses kommunismiehitamisepäevil" (The Curious Cases of Heroic Comrade Major at the Services of KGB in the Days of Communism, 2020)
- "Kompartei sekretäri juubel" (Anniversary of the Secretary of the Communist Party); A short story, "Fate & Secrets" magazine, March 2021.
- "Mürsuplahvatuse järelkaja" (Shell Explosion Aftermath); A short story, "Fate & Secrets" magazine, April–May 2021.
- "Samovarivaras" (The Samovar Thief); A short story, Nelli Teataja magazine, 1 April 2021.
- "Massvaktsineerimine" (Mass Vaccination); A short story, Nelli Teataja Newspaper, 16 April 2021.
- "Sinise Põrssa Pubi" (Blue Piglet Pub); A short story, "Fate & Secrets" magazine, June 2021.
- " Kaos saabub homme, hiljemalt ülehomme"; " Eesti aastal 2044" ( "Chaos will be there tomorrow or the day after tomorrow, at the latest"; "Estonia in the year 2044"), author`s edition, 2021.
- "Kaos saabub homme, hiljemalt ülehomme" ("Chaos will be there tomorrow or the day after tomorrow, at the latest"), 2022.
- "Infosõja agendid planeedil Maa" ("The agents of information war on planet Earth"), author`s edition. 2022.
- "Mina ei ole mina" ("I am not me"), author`s edition, 2023.
- "Mina ei ole mina"; "Infosõja agendid" ("I am not me"; "The agents of information war"), DIGAR, 2023.
- "Mina ei ole mina"; "Infosõja agendid" ("I am not me"; "The agents of information war"), Kentaur edition, 2023.
- "Rooside sõda" (The War of the Roses); story. Short stories and stories, WordPress, 2024.
- "Vilepuhuja" (Whistleblower); story. Short stories and stories, WordPress, 2024.
- "Ammu kustunud võlg" (A debt long since extinguished); story. Short stories and stories, WordPress, 2024.
- "Novelle ja jutustusi" (Short stories and stories), DIGAR, 2024.
- Ooper "Vangidele videvik, Stalinile koidupuna". (Opera "Twilight for Prisoners, Dawn for Stalin". Libretto by Uido Truija, published in "When Power Goes Crazy", 2012, Chapter 12. Performed on a computer using AI; published online), 2025.
- "The Path of Man", an essay, WordPress, 2026.
- "The Kiss of the Cannibal Beauty of Nuku Hiva", story, WordPress 2026.
- Uido Truija "Audiobooks", YouTube, 2026.
- "Оплеуха человечеству", аудиокнига, YouTube, 2026.
- "Have you been beaten yet?" Short story; Õhtuleht, April 15.1999.
- Uido Truija "Audiobooks" in English, YouTube, 2026.
- Uido Truija "Hörbücher" auf Deutsch, YouTube, 2026.

== Publications ==
- Hagiavaldus kohtusse: käsiraamat (Statement of Claim to the Court, 1999)
- Kaebus halduskohtusse (Appeal to an Administrative Court, 2000)
- Võlaõigus ettevõtluses (Law of Obligations in Business Activity, 2001)
- Võlaõigusseadus ja selle rakendamine: käsiraamat (Law of Obligations Act and Its Application: Handbook, 2002)
- Lepingute kogumik: praktiline käsiraamat (Collection of Contracts: Practical Handbook, 2002)
- Hagide ja kaebuste esitamine kohtusse (Filing an Action to Court, 2003)
- Hagimenetlus tsiviilasjas (Action of Proceeding Concerning a Civil Matter, 2006)
- "Käsiraamat ettevõtjale, I osa" (Handbook for entrepreneures, Part I", 1999)
- "Käsiraamat ettevõtjale, II osa" (Handbook for entrepreneurs, Part II", 1999

== Reviews ==
- Jan Kaus. Lennata või roomata? Teadvuses või reaalsuses? (To Fly or to Crawl? In Consciousness or in Reality?) – Looming nr. 3 (2003), p 399–425. (Overview of Estonian prose in 2002)
- Jüri Kallas. Täitsa tavaline ulmeaasta (Completely Ordinary Year of Science Fiction) – Looming nr. 3 (2003), p 426–431. (Overview of Estonian science fiction in 2002)
- Mihkel Mutt. Eesti kirjandus kui pretensioon.vandenõu.com (Estonian Literature as pretension.conspiracy.com) – Looming nr 3 (2007), p 431-454. (Overview of Estonian prose in 2006)
