= Escola Superior Náutica Infante Dom Henrique =

Portuguese state-run maritime studies college

Infante D. Henrique Nautical School
- Escola Superior Náutica Infante D. Henrique
- Type: state-run maritime studies polytechnical college
- Established: 1924
- President: Vitor Manuel dos Reis Franco Correia
- Academic staff: 70
- Administrative staff: 25
- Students: 800
- Undergraduates: 650
- Postgraduates: 150
- Location: Av. Eng. Bonneville Franco, 2770-058 Paço de Arcos, Paço d'Arcos, Oeiras, Lisbon District, Portugal
- Campus: Urban
- Website: www.enautica.pt

The Escola Superior Náutica Infante D. Henrique (formerly "Escola Náutica Infante D. Henrique") or ENIDH is a state-run college of higher education dedicated to nautical studies, situated in Paço de Arcos, Oeiras, in the Portuguese district of Lisbon. Literally, the Prince Henry Nautical School, it was named for the Portuguese prince Henry the Navigator. It is the official Portuguese maritime college and specializes in maritime studies.

== History ==
The first institutionalized courses for merchant marine officers began as part of the Royal Naval Academy (Academia Real de Marinha) in 1779. They were then transferred to the Polytechnic School of Lisbon (Escola Politécnica de Lisboa) in 1837, and then to the Naval School in 1911.

An institution meant specifically for the instruction of merchant marine officers - the Nautical School - was created in 1924, (then as a branch of the Naval School). In 1936 it separated itself from the Naval School and was transferred to the Directorate-General of the Navy (Direcção-Geral de Marinha), near Praça do Comércio.

The first mention, by dispatch, of a need to construct a new nautical school was issued in 1956.

In 1960, the Portuguese President, Américo Tomás, promulgated Decree 43245 (18 October), recognizing the need to provide decent schools for the merchant marine, a preparatory school for nautical officials and schools for mechanics; there was a need for training to support sailors and officers. It was considered advantageous that these schools be constructed on the same site, justifying the construction of the Infante D. Henrique Nautical School.

By the end of the 1960s, the DNISP Delegação das Novas Instalações para os Serviços Públicos (New Installations Delegations for Public Services), a department of the DGEMN Direção-Geral de Edifícios e Monumentos Nacionais (Directorate General for Buildings and National Monuments), was given the charge of selecting and acquiring the land for the new building, in addition to conduct studies and various projects.

The first phase of the construction began in 1970, and concluded in 1972. The second phase of the project involved the construction of Escola de Mestrança e Marinhagem (Boatswain and Sailors School), boarding school and installations. The preparatory for the merchant marine had a capacity for 350 students, and was officially considered an institution of higher education in the same year.

== Academics ==
The Escola Superior Náutica Infante D. Henrique is a Portuguese maritime and Polytechnical college dedicated to education and training of merchant marine officers (deck officers, engineering officers and electro-technical officers), as well as the training of other professionals for the maritime industry, ports, transportation and logistics.

ENIDH's master's degrees are intended for postgraduate training of merchant marine officers and other cadres for the transport sector that meet the international quality standards adopted in the maritime-port sector. The skills and knowledge required of these professionals, given their vastness and specificity, can not be ensured through undergraduate training. It is an important preparatory school for qualified professionals, engaged in the development of scientific research activities in the field of transport.

There are a set of specific subjects for international certification of Merchant Marine Officers at the management level, in compliance with the STCW Convention of the International Maritime Organization.

=== Higher education programmes ===
ENIDH offers the following degree programmes oriented for the training of future merchant marine officers:

- Licentiate and masters in Piloting (Deck officers' programme)
- Licentiate and masters in Marine machines engineering (Engineering officers' programme)
- Licentiate in Marine electro-technical engineering (Electro-technical officers' programme)

The licentiate degrees (three years of study) in Piloting and Marine machines engineering give access, respectively, to the careers of deck officers and engineer officers of the merchant marine. The master's degrees (two years of study after the licentiate degree) in Piloting and Marine machines engineering allow the promotion, respectively, to the ranks of first officer and captain and first engineer and chief engineer. The Marine electro-technical engineering programme prepares students for the position of electro-technical officer.

Besides the above programmes, ENIDH also offers the following specific degrees:

- Licentiate in Transport and logistics management
- Licentiate in Port management
- Licentiate in Informatics and Computer Engineering

=== Professional Higher Technical Courses ===
In addition, professional higher technical courses (CTESP) include:

- Naval Mechanics
- Naval Mechatronics
- Information Systems and Networks
- Recreational Navigation and Maritime-Tourist Operation
- Energy Sustainability and Climate Control
- Fishing and Tug Operations Maritime

== Architecture ==
The school is situated on an elevated plain along the coastal roadway that follows the Tagus estuary.

The building consists of three corps, two parallel to the river, that are three- to five-storeys for classes, with 34 halls and another with two-storeys of administrative services and student body, such as the secretariat, professors' hall, gathering room, bar and lounge. There are three groups of staircases and two elevators. Alongside the principal block are the one-storey workshops, connected by covered gallery, that includes the thermal power station.

=== Main building ===
The main building, or Escola de Oficiais da Marinha Mercante (Merchant Marine Officers' School) has an orthogonal, longitudinal plan with principal entrance in the centre, from which expand two wings destined for classes in the west and east. This structure is three to four floors and a third oriented to the south (of two-storeys), used for support services offices. Circulation occurs across ample corridors, with adequate capacity, and by staircases with two flights, located on the extremes of the corridors. There are also two elevators alongside the atrium that serves the five floors of the building. This building also houses the bridge and engine room simulators.

=== Workshops ===
The practical workshops are located on a single, ground floor, implanted to the north of the principal building, and interlinked to the east by awning. The large workshops include a design hall, washrooms and changing rooms, as well as an electrical transformer and switch, covered in cement ceiling tile and skylights providing natural illumination. Access and circulation to the spaces are provided across a central corridor, with various sections and complementary passages to the exterior.

=== Marine School ===
The Escola de Mestrança e Marinhagem (Master Seamen and Seafaring School), the B and C wings, develop from an orthogonal plan to the south, from which two wings extend, with eastern and western support wings, with four floors and understructure, surmounted by partial fifth floor adjacent to the principal staircase and elevator, to the marine equipment wing. The western wing includes two floors for support services. Similar to the main building, it includes large circulation corridors and two flights of stairs, located on the extremes that serve all floors.

Wing A, extends from the extreme western point of Wing B of the School of Seamanship and Seafaring, longitudinally from the south, and the large veins oriented to the east, with a subfloor and four floors, with staircases on either extreme. It serves as the boarding school, with kitchen and refectory, laundry and support areas; the subfloor is used for storage; the ground floor with central corridor, includes laundry and linen, student dormitories and washrooms; the first floor includes kitchen, pantry and large refectory, in addition to washrooms; and the remaining floors, with student dormitories, support washrooms and a central "quad".

=== Sports hall ===
Isolated in a central terrain, the simple sports pavilion consists of a single large nave, for social and sporting events, with annexes for storage, washrooms and change rooms, stage and projection booth. There are five exits through bi-fold doors, with one in the changing area.

=== Pool ===
In land near the northern wall, between the workshops and Seamanship and Seafaring School is the pool, similar to the other buildings in the complex. It includes two floors, with the first occupied by a variable-depth pool, technical areas, storage and accessways to change rooms, while the secondary floor includes bunk seating and change rooms, accessible by two-flights of stairs. In addition to entranceway on the ground floor, there are two doors at the second floor, for visitors' access to seating and exit, and a passageway to the catwalk over the diving tank. The space is covered in cement slabs and skylights with exterior illumination.
