= Centro de Instrução Almirante Brás de Aguiar =

Brazilian military academy

Almirante Brás de Aguiar Instruction Center
- Centro de Instrução Almirante Brás de Aguiar
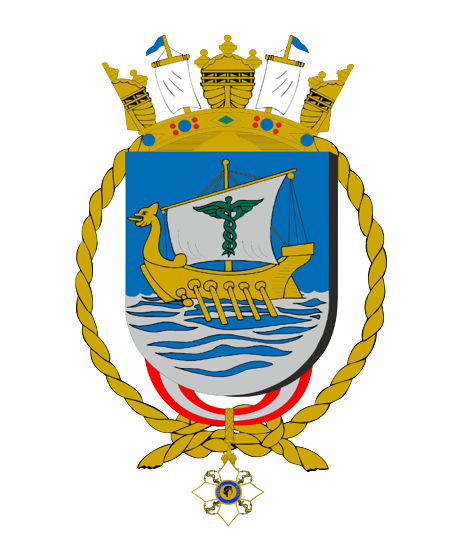
- Motto: Educar e Navegar
- Motto in English: Educate & Navegate
- Type: Public University-level Military academy
- Established: October 13, 1892; 133 years ago (Escola de Machinistas do Estado do Pará)
- Affiliations: Brazilian Navy
- Commander: Cpt. João Orlando Enes Prudêncio
- Location: Belém, Pará, Brazil; 1.370°S 48.479°W
- Website: www.marinha.mil.br/ciaba/

The Almirante Brás de Aguiar Instruction Center (Portuguese: Centro de Instrução Almirante Brás de Aguiar, CIABA) OMN is a military organization of the Brazilian Navy. The institution it is charged with training officers for the Brazilian Merchant Marine and Brazilian Navy Reserve Officer Corps.

Located in the Amazon region, it nonetheless attracts exchange students from all over the country and even from other Latin American and African countries. The students are Midshipmen in the Brazilian Navy during the three-year-long course. The Academy is certified by the International Maritime Organization and its graduates receive an STCW certificate.

== History ==
The history of the institution begins when it is established the Machinist Course and Nautical Course, created by the then President of the Republic Marshal Floriano Peixoto in 1892, on the demand of the Admiral Custódio José de Melo. Its first headquarters was installed in a room of the old Navy Arsenal Inspectorate building, where the Convent of São Boaventura dos Religiosos da Conceição do Beira de Minhos used to be, and where the Command of the 4th Naval District of the Brazilian Navy is located today.

On April 20, 1893, by Decree No. 1362, it was turned into the Machinists and Pilots School (Portuguese: Escola de Machinistas e Pilotos do Estado do Pará). In 1907, new classes started to be taught, such as the Commissary and Radiotelegraphy Courses, which occasioned a new transformation. The Merchant Marine School of Pará (Portuguese: Escola de Marinha Mercante do Pará, EMMPA) was created, which left the small room at the Arsenal of the Navy to occupy its new two-story building, also built on land owned by the Command of the Fourth Naval District.

EMMPA continued to train and adapt crew members, pilots, machinists, radiotelegraph operators and commissioners until, due to technological progress, it was again transformed into the Almirante Brás de Aguiar Training Center by Decree No. 71,718 of January 16, 1973, at the suggestion of the Pará historian Augusto Meira Filho.

== Merchant Marine Officer Training School ==
The Merchant Marine Officer Training School (Portuguese: Escola de Formação de Oficiais da Marinha Mercante, EFOMM) is designed to train deck officers and engineers, with a bachelor degree in Nautical Science and as members of the Brazilian Navy's military reserve force board with the rank of 2nd Lieutenant.

The entire student body is referred to as the Regiment of Midshipmen and is subdivided into three battalions. The 1st and 2nd Companies form the 1st Battalion, the 3rd and Band Companies make up the 2nd Battalion, while the 4th and 5th Company make the 3rd Battalion. Company assignment is random.

== Organization ==
The academy is administered by the Brazilian Maritime Administration (Portuguese: Diretoria de Portos e Costas), funded by the Merchant Marine Fund (Portuguese: Fundo da Marinha Mercante).

== Academics ==
The Centro de Instrução Almirante Brás de Aguiar is dedicated to education and training of merchant marine officers (deck officers, engineering officers, as well as the training of other professionals for the maritime industry, ports, transportation and logistics).

=== Undergraduated education programmes ===
CIABA-EFOMM offers the following degree programmes oriented for the training of future merchant marine officers:

- B.Sc. in Maritime studies (Deck officers' programme)
- B.Sc. in Marine machines engineering (Engineering officers' programme)

The bachelor degrees (three years of study) in Marine studies and Marine machines engineering give access, respectively, to the careers of deck officers and engineer officers of the merchant marine.

=== Professional technical courses ===
In addition, professional technical (PREPOM) courses include:

- Able seaman (Portuguese: Marinheiro Fluvial de Convés, MFC)
- Motorman (Portuguese: Marinheiro Fluvial de Máquinas, MFM)
- Ordinary seaman (Portuguese: Moço de Convés, MOC)
- Ordinary motorman (Portuguese: Moço de Máquinas, MOM)
- Steward (Portuguese: Cozinheiro ou Taifeiro, CTS)

== See also ==
- List of Brazilian Ministers of the Navy
- List of maritime colleges
