= Estonian Maritime Academy =

Unit of Tallinn University of Technology

- Eesti Mereakadeemia
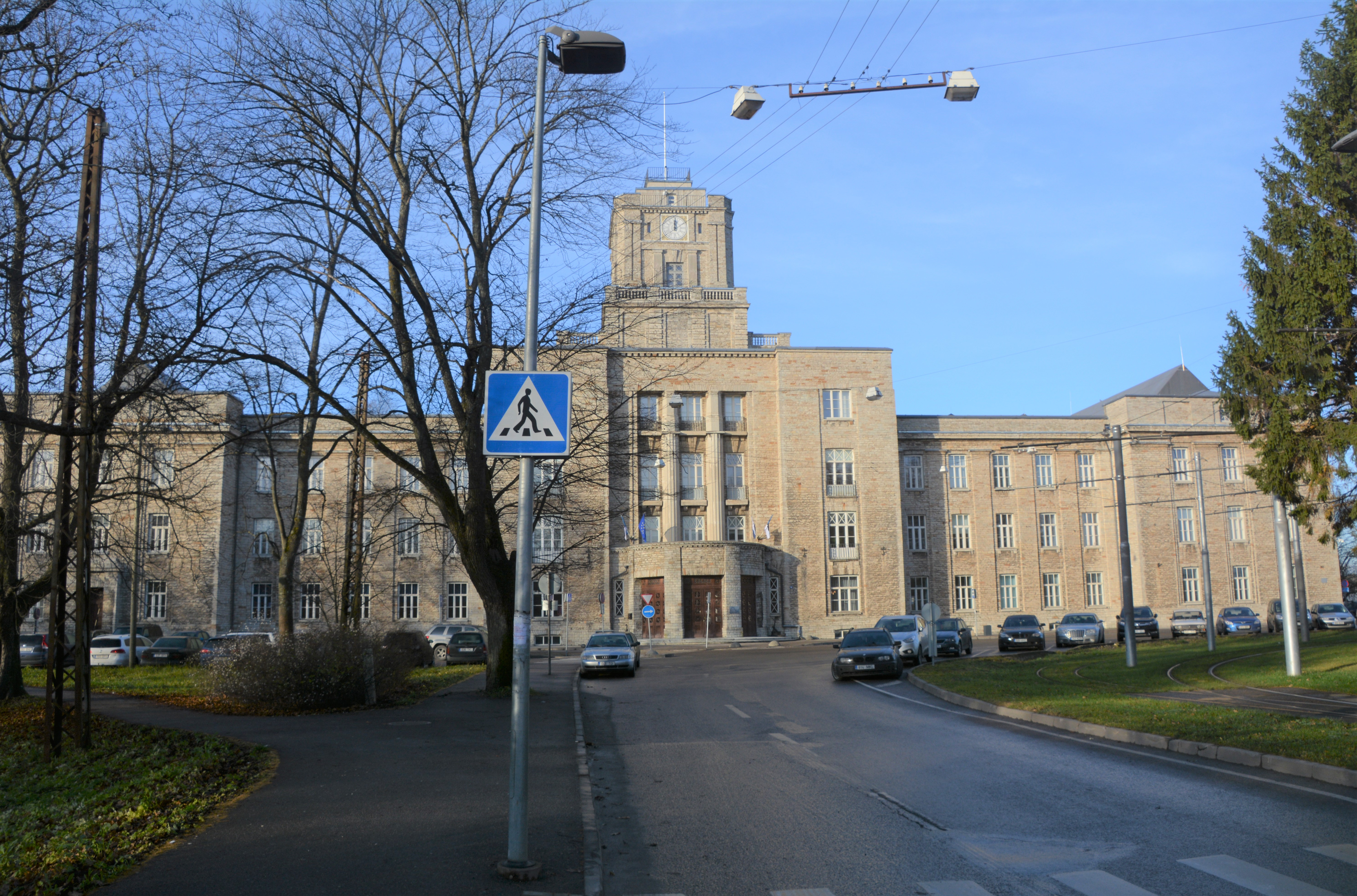
- Former name: Estonian Maritime Education Center
- Type: Public
- Established: 1919; 107 years ago
- Affiliations: Tallinn University of Technology
- Director: Roomet Leiger
- Students: 813 (2012)
- Location: Kopli 101, Tallinn, Estonia; 59°27′42″N 24°39′59″E
- Language: Estonian
- Mascot: Triibert
- Website: taltech.ee

Estonian Maritime Academy of Tallinn University of Technology (Estonian: TalTech Eesti Mereakadeemia, or EMERA) is a vocational university in Estonia. It is one of the schools of Tallinn University of Technology and it is the only educational institution in Estonia that offers professional higher education, Master’s and Doctoral level education in the maritime field. The university is located in the capital Tallinn but also has two centres in Saaremaa. In addition to higher education, the school contributes to research, provides training and offers services. The Academy also holds a one of a kind Simulator Centre and has a whole dedicated floor of hi-tech laboratories.

== History ==
The first marine school in Estonia was founded in 1715 in Tallinn, later the school was founded in Narva as well. In these so-called calculation-schools, the sailors and shipbuilders studied different subjects, including navigation.

In 1880, a school was founded in Tallinn for children of the port factory and workshop staff. The better graduates of the school received the right to work as deck officers on ships. In the second half of the 19th century, a number of Estonian maritime schools were founded. The first of these was the Heinaste Maritime School (1864-1916), where the teaching languages were Estonian, Russian and Latvian. Other maritime schools followed in other cities as well: in Narva (1873 – 1918), Paldiski (1876 – 1916), Käsmu (1884 – 1931), Kuressaare (1891 – 1915), (1919 – 1928), (1942 – 1944), and Pärnu (1919 – 1922), (1945 – 1989).

The Tallinn Maritime School, the predecessor of the Estonian Maritime Academy of TUT, was founded in 1919. At the same time, a class of engineer officers was opened at the Tallinn University of Applied Sciences (Estonian: Tallinna Tehnikum), which in 1920 became the Tallinn Ship Engineer School and, in 1935, was merged with the Tallinn Maritime School.

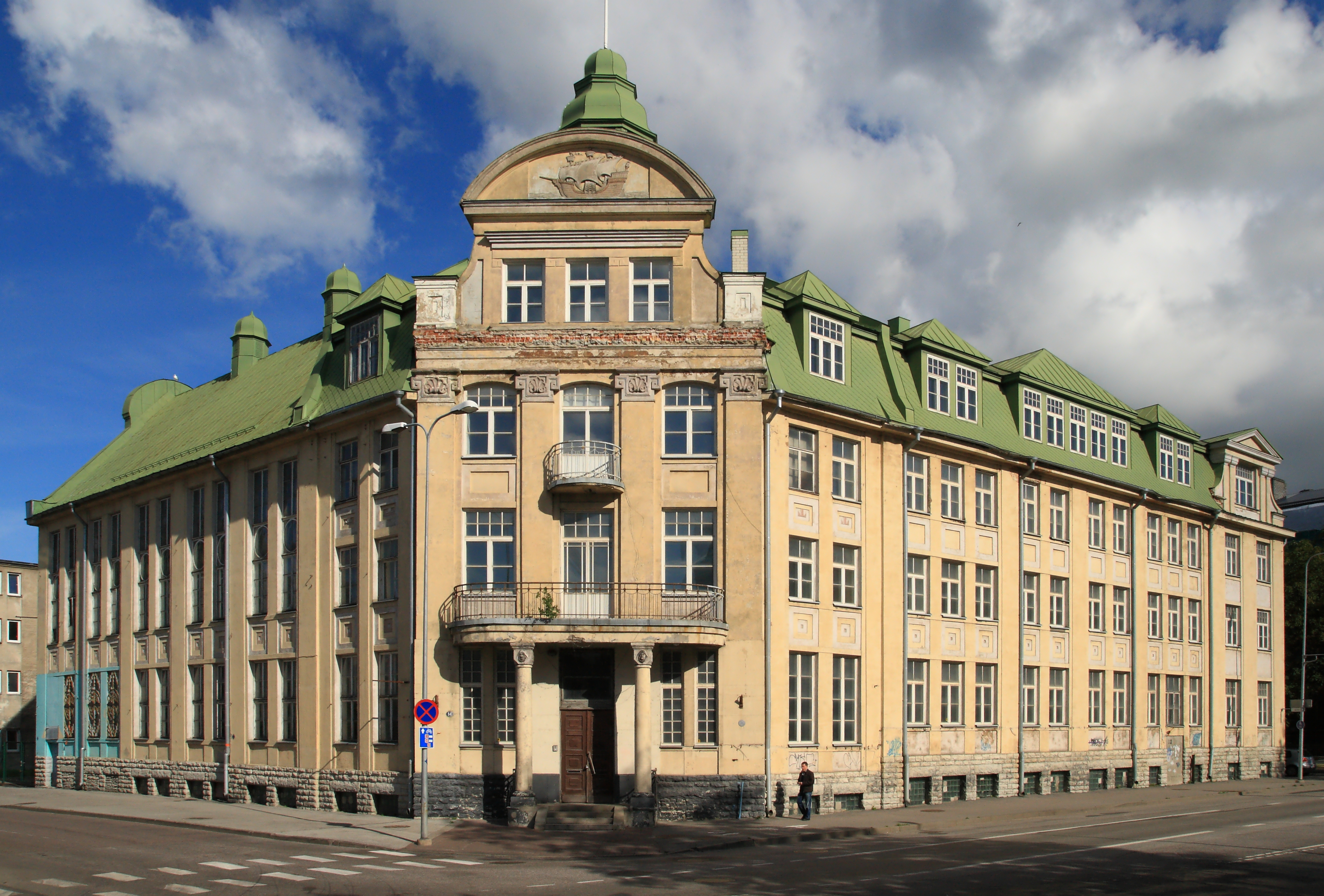
Tallinn Maritime School building

In 1945, the Tallinn Marine Fisheries Technicum was established, which was renamed the Tallinn Fisheries Technical School in 1956, the Tallinn Fish Industry Marine School in 1965, and the Tallinn Marine College in 1989.

During the period of Soviet occupation from 1945 to 1991, the Estonian Maritime Schools belonged to the unified maritime education system of the USSR, and therefore the maritime education of Estonia was predominantly in Russian. In the newly independent Estonia, Estonian is again the language of instruction.

At the beginning of the 1990s, three educational institutions in the maritime education field were provided in Tallinn:

- Tallinn Maritime School (Estonian: Tallinna Merekool)
- Tallinn Marine College (Estonian: Tallinna Merekolledž)
- Tallinn 1st Industrial School (Estonian: Tallinna 1. Kutsekeskkool)

In 1992, a united Estonian Maritime Education Center was formed, which merged Tallinn's Marine College and Tallinn 1st Industrial School. Before that, in 1991, the Pärnu Maritime School and the Oceanic Sea Marine School of Production were liquidated.

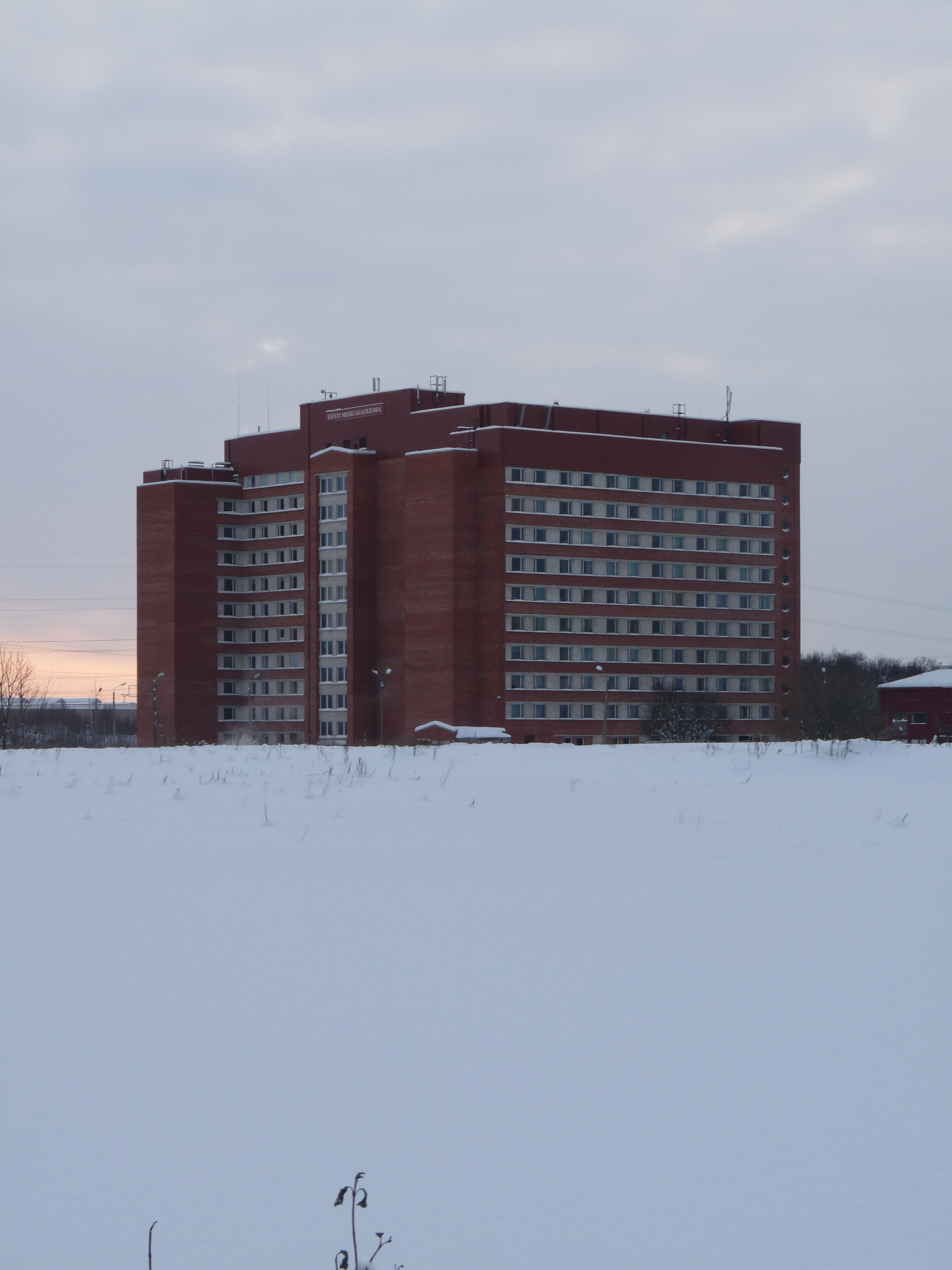
The former school building in Mustakivi street 25 which was used from 1994–2012

In 1999 Estonian Marine Education Center was renamed to the Estonian Maritime Academy.

In the autumn of 2006, a master's degree in maritime academy was opened.

In 2009, the Marine Academy's management moved from Lasnamäe to the top of the Kopli peninsula at the Kopli 101 building. Different faculties followed: The Maritime Faculty and the Training Center from Luise street building and in 2012, the Faculty of Shipping, the Faculty of Mechanical Engineering and other support structures from the Mustakivi street building. On August 1, 2014, the Estonian Maritime Academy joined the Technical University of Tallinn and became one of the colleges and since then has been renamed Estonian Maritime Academy of TUT. When joining TUT, the Estonian Maritime Academy was separated from the Industrial Education Department, which became an independent educational institution called the Estonian Maritime School, located in the Kopli 101 courtyard building. The Joining Agreement was signed on April 23 of the same year.

On January 1, 2017, the Estonian Maritime Academy of TUT became one out of the five faculties of the TUT. When joining, the former TUT Kuressaare College was named the Kuressaare Center of the Estonian Maritime Academy of TUT. TTU Small Craft Competence Center (SCC) continued with its former name.

== Kuressaare College ==
TalTech Kuressaare College

In 2014, the Small Craft Competence Center was opened, the college celebrated its 15th birthday at the new address Tallinn 19, the electronic systems and the small craft engineering curricula were merged into the Marine Engineering programme. In 2017, TUT Kuressaare College was joined to the Maritime Academy. When joining, the former TUT Kuressaare College was named the Kuressaare Center of the Estonian Maritime Academy of TUT. TTU Small Craft Competence Center (SCC) continued with its former name. Kuressaare College contributes to Saaremaa-specific sectors of the blue economy by providing engineering and entrepreneurship education and R&D services. Higher education is offered in three study programmes: applied higher education studies in Marine Engineering, bachelor's studies in Sustainable Technologies in Blue Economy and master's studies in Marine Engineering.

== Management ==
Roomet Leiger is Director of the Estonian Maritime Academy since 01/05/2015.

== Managers ==
Rectors

- Tarmo Kõuts, January 1992 – June 1993
- Valdur Aret, July 1993 – August 1995
- Jüri-Toomas Murašov-Petrov, August 1995 – August 1996
- Peeter Veegen, August 1996 – April 2000
- Jüri Lember, April 2000 – March 2006
- Peeter Järvelaid, March 2006 – March 2007
- Jüri Kann, March 2007 – August 2009
- Märt Tomson, August 2009 – December 2010
- Heiki Lindpere, January 2011 – November 2013
- Roomet Leiger, November 2013 – 31 July 2014

Directors

- Roomet Leiger 01.08.2014 – 30.04.2015
- Roomet Leiger (selected director) 01.05.2015 – present

== Programmes ==
Estonian Maritime Academy has 4 higher education programmes, two Master's programme and one Doctoral Studies.

- EMERA Study Programmes
  - Navigation
  - Ship Engineering
  - Port and Shipping Management
  - Waterways Safety Management
- Master's Studies
  - Technical Exploitation of Ships and Navigation
  - Shipping Management
- Doctoral Studies
  - Engineering Sciences (cooperation with the Faculty of Engineering)

== See also ==
- List of universities in Estonia
- List of maritime colleges
- Tallinn Maritime School
- Estonian Nautical School
