= Peeter Järvelaid =

Estonian legal scholar and historian (born 1957)

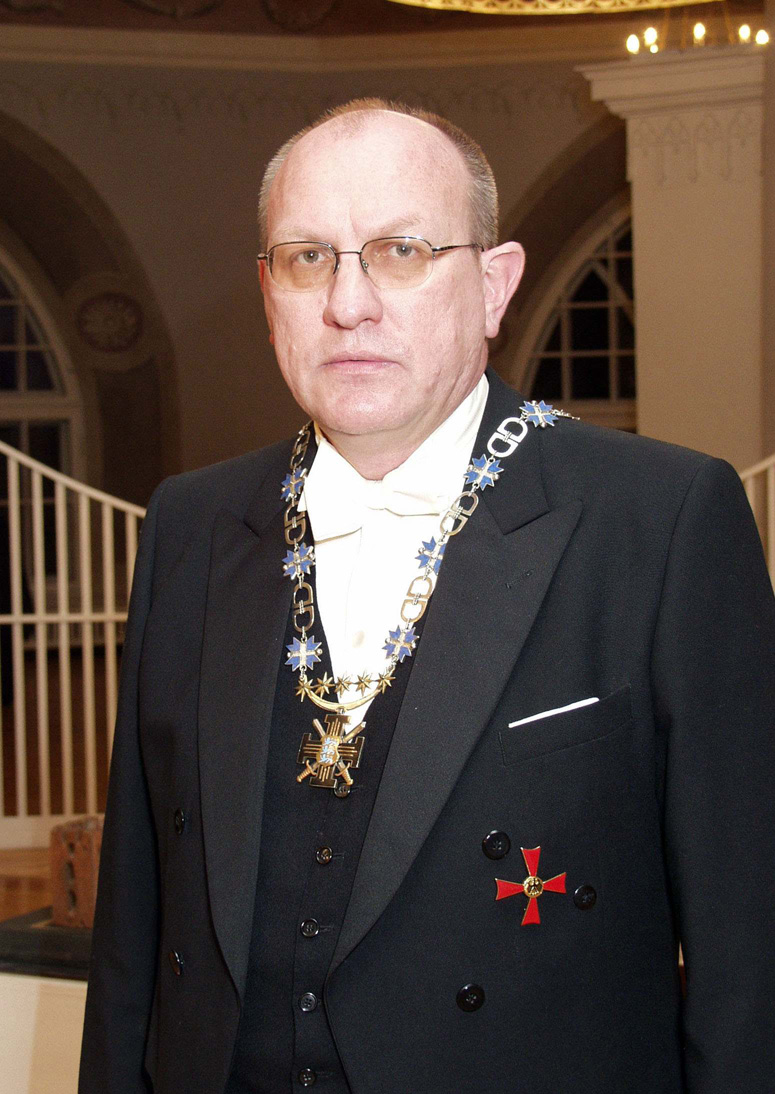
Peeter Järvelaid

Peeter Järvelaid (born 28 November 1957) is an Estonian legal scholar and historian. Järvelaid was a professor in the University of Tallinn, but was degraded to associate professor in 2016. He claims that he has developed semiotic and personality-centered research direction, writing hundreds of articles mostly about the European and Estonian legal history and education, published in Estonian, English, German, French, Russian, Latvian, Finnish, Lithuanian and Swedish. Since 2006 his studies have been increasingly concentrated on the international relations in the 20th century, which among others has required intensive archival researches in German and Polish archives. Since 2012 Järvelaid has placed his research emphasis on the German diplomatic missions, with a specific interest in German diplomatic representation in Tallinn.

== Early life and education ==
Peeter Järvelaid was born in Tallinn to a military family. Järvelaid graduated 1981 from the University of Tartu and received his J. D. from the Moscow All-Union Correspondence Institute of Law in 1990.

== Career ==
Since 1981 he taught in Faculty of Law at the University of Tartu. In 1992 he became full Professor of Estonian legal history and then in 1993 Professor of Estonian legal history. In 1997 the research efforts of Järvelaid received the Fellowship of the Alexander von Humboldt Foundation, which in 1998-2000 and 2012 enabled him to carry out his research activities in the Max Planck Institute for European History of Law and other reputed German academic centers. He then moved to the University Nord, which later evolved into the Tallinn University Law School in 2010, where he was Professor of Law, Head of Studies and Dean. In 1997–2000, Järvelaid was the advisor to the Estonian Ministry of Justice; he also has been the Rector of the Estonian Academy of Security Sciences (2003–2005) and the Estonian Maritime Academy (2006–2007). From the late 2010s he has hold positions in Tallinn municipal administration (Estonian Centre Party).

== Honours ==
In 2003 Järvelaid received the 1st class of the Order of Merit of the Federal Republic of Germany.

== Editorial publications ==
Järvelaid is on the editorial board Istoriya gosudarstva i prava (Russia), Osteuropa-Recht (Germany), Latvijas Universitates Zinatnieskie Raksti (Latvian) and Jog, törteneti szemle (Hungary). He is also corresponding member of the Baltic Historical Commission (Baltische Historische Kommission).

== Selected publications ==
- Die Rezeption Kelsens und der Einfluss der Reinen Rechtslehre in Estland. Robert Walter, Clemens Jabloner, Klaus Zeleny (Ed.). Hans Kelsen anderswo - Hans Kelsen abroad: Der Einfluss der Reinen Rechtslehre auf die Rechtstheorie in verschiedenen Ländern, 73 - 88. Hans-Kelsen-Institut - Universität Wien, Austria: Manz'sche Verlags Wien (2010).
- Das Frühwerk Ilmar Tammelos: Der Weg zum Wissenschaftler. Raimund Jakob, Lothar Philipps, Erich Schweighofer, Csaba Varga (Ed.). Auf dem Weg zur Idee der Gerechtigkeit. Gedenkschrift für Ilmar Tammelo 5 - 21. Wien-Münster: LIT (2009).
- Friedrich Georg von Bunge und Leo Leesment. Ein biographischer Essay. Baltisch-europäische Rechtsgeschichte und Lexikographie 233 - 280. Heidelberg, Heidelberger Akademie der Wissenschaften: Universitätsverlag Winter (2009).
- Baltische Rechtswissenschaftsgeschichte: Professor Jüri Uluots (1890-1945) in seiner und unserer zait. Juridiskā zinātne = Law, 740, 73 - 94. (2008).
- Europäische Rechtshistoriker des 19. Jahrhunderts Professor Oswald Schmidt - ein Jurist aus Livland, der während des Zeitalters des Nationalismus und nationalen Erwachens Rechtsgeschichte lehrte. Juridiskā zinātne = Law, 61 - 72. (2008).
- Kein Staat ohne Staatsmythos. Kalevipoeg – seine staatstragende Gestaltung für Estland. Ein Versuch das Reich Kreutzwalds und Kalevipoegs zu rekonstruieren. Diestelkamp, B. (Ed.). Liber Amicorum Kjell A. Modeer 285 - 294. Lund: Lund University Press (2007).
- Baltische Rechtswissenschaftsgeschichte: zwei grenzüberschreitende Rechtshistoriker Friedrich von Bunge und Leo Leesment. Juridiskā zinātne = Law, 99 - 138. Rīga: Latvijas Universitāte: Latvia (2006).
- F. G. von Bunge als Professor an der Universität Dorpat/Tartu (1831-1842). In: Õpetatud Eesti Seltsi Toimetised XXXV: Tundmatu Friedrich Georg von Bunge: Materjale Õpetatud Eesti Seltsi konverentsilt 200 aastat prof Friedrich Georg von Bunge (1802-1897) sünnist Tartu Ülikooli ajaloo muuseumis 27. aprillil 2002.., 2006, 70 - 75. (2006).
- Kalevipoeg - seine staatstragende Gestaltung für Estland: Versuch, Kalevipoeg durch Kreutzwalds Leben zu rekonstruieren. Kalevipoeg: das estniche Nationalepos, 307 - 314. Stuttgart, Berlin: Berlin: Mayer (2004).
- Enlargement of the European Union in the 21-st century - either integration or moving on parallel ways? In: Evaluation of legislation: proceedings of the fourth congress of the European Association of Legislation (EAL): Evaluation of legislation in Warsaw (Poland), 15th-16th 2000. Baden-Baden: European Association of Legislation; Deutsche Gesellschaft für Gesetzgebung, 2002, 156-169. (2002).
- Rolle der Rechtsgeschichte bei der Wiederherstellung der Souveränität der baltischen Staaten in der 90-er Jahren. In: Rättshistoria i förändring. Olinska stiftelsen 50 år. Ett internationellt symposium i Stockholm den 19–21 November 1997: Legal History in Change. The Olin Foundation for Legal History 50 Years; Stockholm; 19–21 November 1997. Lund: Lund University, 2002, 293 - 302. (2002).
- Die Zeit zwischen den Weltkriegen: westliche Vorbilder für die innere Organisation der neuen Staaten? Die baltischen Staaten im Schnittpunkt der Entwicklungen: Vergangenheit und Gegenwart, 133 - 140. Basel: Schwabe Verlag. (2002).
- Oikeuskanslerin instituutio Virossa – historiaa ja nykypäivää. Lakimies, 4, 726 - 734. (2001).
- Estonian legal culture on the threshold to the 21st century. International Journal of Legal Information, 1, 75 - 83. (2001).
- Von Göttingen nach Dorpat : Johann Philipp Gustav Ewers (1779-1830). Jahrbuch des baltischen Deutschtums, Band XLVII 2000 (20 - 25). Lüneburg (2000).
- The development of the Estonian legal system. Reform of the legal system of the Republic of Estonia, 1992-1999. Zeitschrift für europäisches Privatrecht, 4, 873 - 877. (2000).
- Die historische Rechtsschule Rußlands in Dorpat und Professor Neumann. Steinbrücke. Estnische Historische Zeitschrift, 199 – 218. (1998).
- Die historische Rechtsschule Russlands und Professor Neumann. Must, A. (Ed.). Steinbrücke (199 -218). Tartu: Ajaloosihtasutus Kleio (1998).
- On the correlation of the legislative and executive power in the Republic of Estonia (1918-1940) Theorie und Institutionsystem der Gewaltentrennung in Europa. Budapest. (Studies on public administration and law; 4), 139-148 (1993).
