= Toba National College of Maritime Technology =

Maritime college in Japan

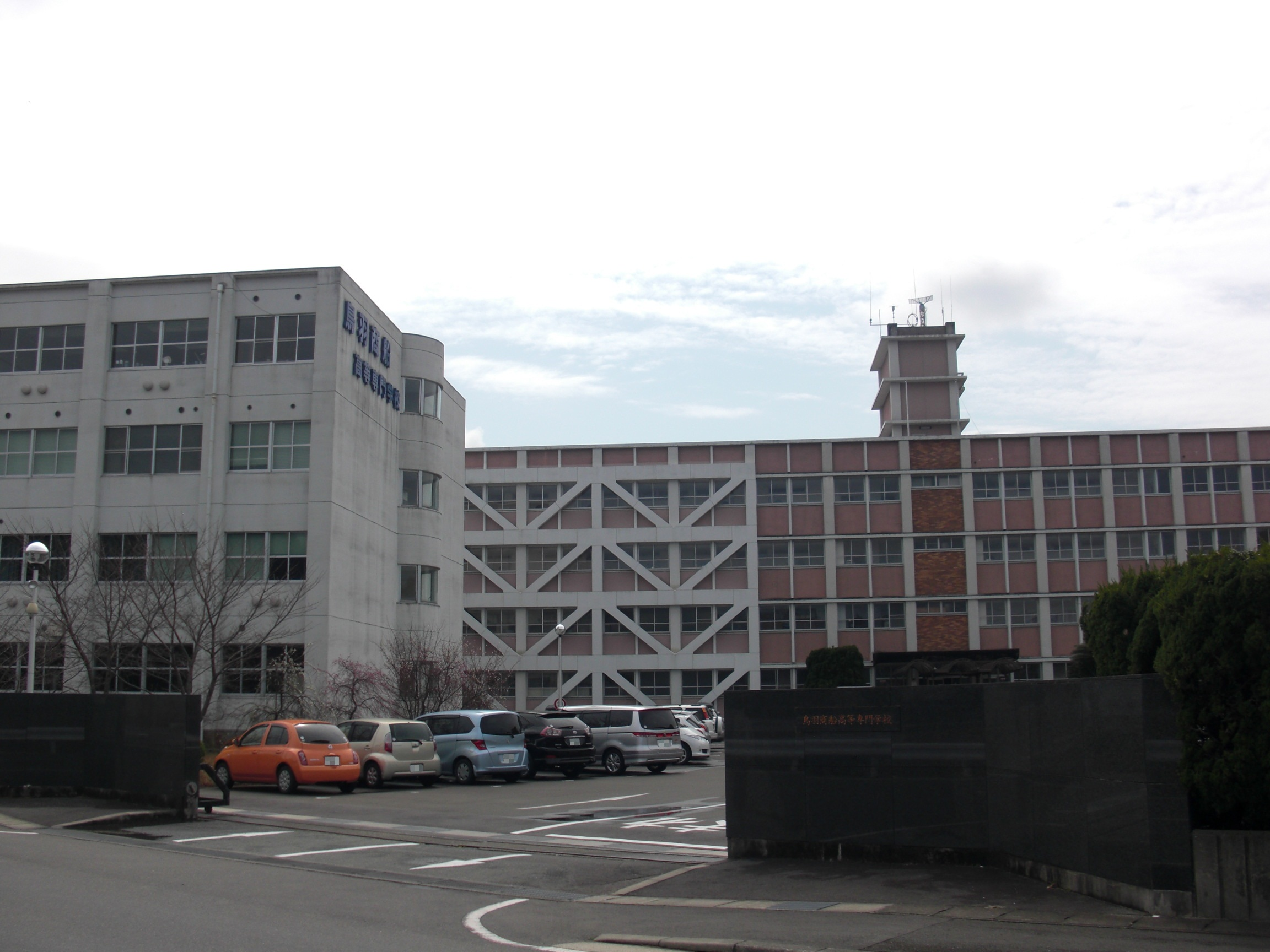
- Type: Public
- Established: 1881
- President: Yasutsugu Nitta
- Undergraduates: 650 students
- Postgraduates: 25 students
- Location: Toba, Mie, Japan; 34°28′56.0″N 136°49′29.5″E
- Colors: Navy Blue and Gold
- Mascot: Marine Crab
- Website: www.toba-cmt.ac.jp

Toba National College of Maritime Technology (鳥羽商船高等専門学校, Toba Shōsen Kōtō Senmon Gakkō) is one of five maritime colleges in Japan. Established in 1881, it is the oldest continuously-operated national maritime college in the country.

== Toba maritime programs ==
The programs are of about 4.5 years and an additional 1.5 years of practical training in the sea. The college conducts the following maritime programs:

- Nautical program for Deck Officers and Captains
- Marine Engineering programs for Engineering Officers
- Advanced Programs (Maritime System Major and the Information Control / Mechatronics Production System Engineering Major)

== See also ==
- List of maritime colleges
