= Estonian Nautical School =

Vocational school in Tallinn, Estonia

- Eesti Merekool
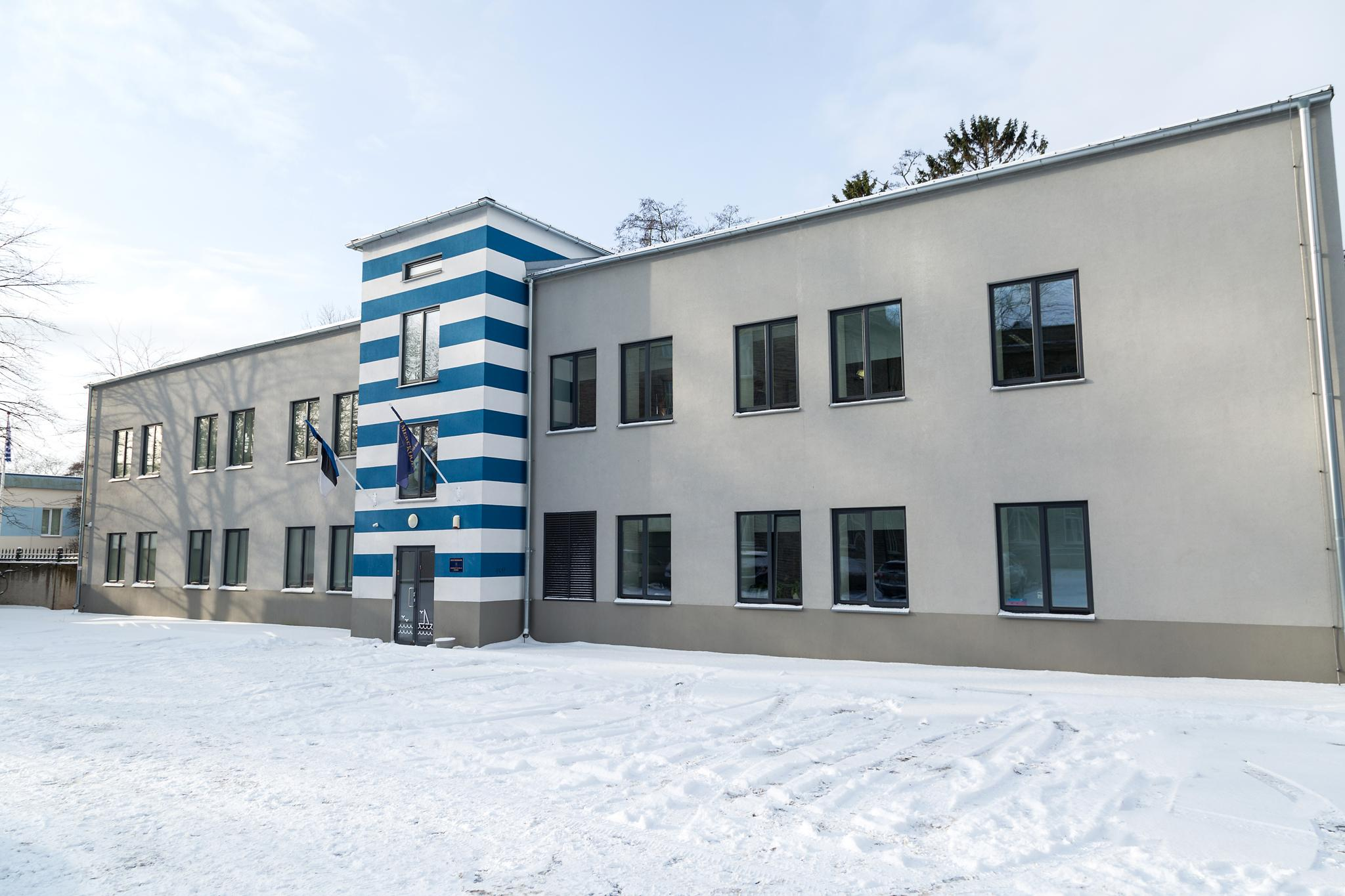

Location
- Kopli 101/1; Tallinn
- 59°27′42″N 24°39′55″E

Information
- Motto: Meri hoiab hoolsaid, toidab tegusaid!
- Established: 1920
- Director: Tarmo Sööt
- Language: Estonian
- Website: merekool.ee

Estonian Nautical School (Estonian: Eesti Merekool) is a vocational school in Estonia. It is the only maritime vocational school in Estonia. Estonian Nautical School also has filial in Tartu.

== History ==
=== 1920-1944 ===
On 1 March 1920 Tallinna Puutööstuse Õppetuba was opened in Endla street 19 house. It was first Estonian industrial school and first step towards vocational education development. In 1924 the school was named Riigi Puu- ja Rauatöökool in Tallinn and in 1926 it was named State Industrial School in Tallinn.

In 1941, the school was split in two: Railway school and Industrial school.

=== 1944-1991 ===
In 1944 the school was named Industrial School nr 1 which parent company was Estonian Shipping Company. At first in school there was taught metal works but later came different maritime specialties. In 1957 the school started to train workers for fishing fleet.

=== 1991-present ===
After Estonian Restoration of independence in 1991 the Tallinn 1st Industrial School was united with Estonian Maritime Education Center and it was named Eesti Merehariduskeskuse Ametikool. In September 1999 the school was named Eesti Mereakadeemia Ametikool and in October 2001 it was named Nautical College of Estonian Maritime Academy.

When Estonian Maritime Academy and Tallinn University of Technology united then it was necessary to create a special school for vocational education because it is not allowed to give vocational education in university. On 1 May 2014 Ministey of Education established the school Estonian Nautical School.

== Study programmes ==
- Navigation
- Ship Engineering
- Ship's motorman
- Deck seafarer
- Ship's electro-technical rating
- Inland waters navigator

== See also ==
- Estonian Maritime Academy
- List of maritime colleges
