= Vastseliina =

Borough in Estonia

Vastseliina Vahtsõliina (in Võro)
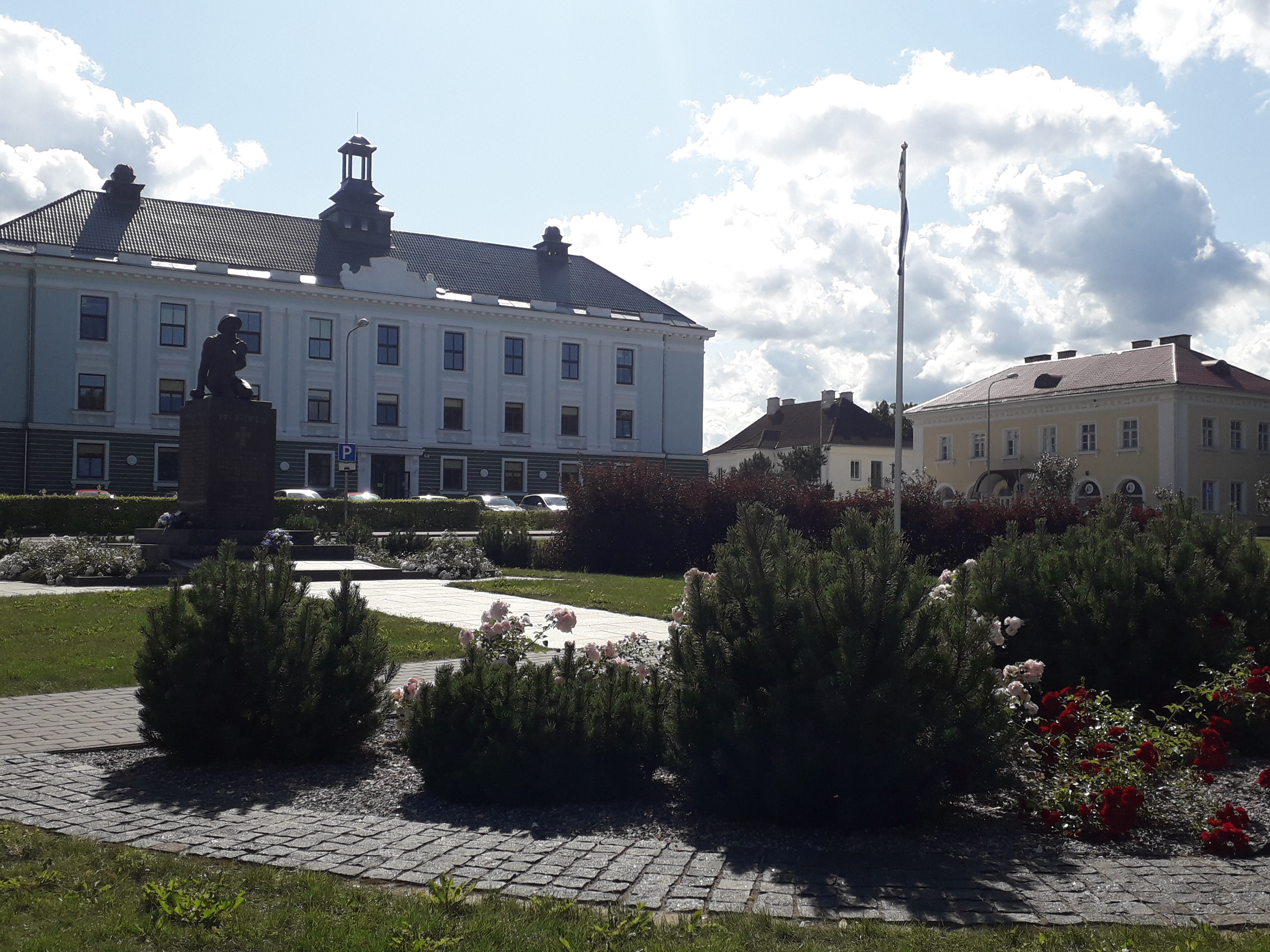
- Vastseliina central square with the monument

- Location within Estonia
- Coordinates: 57°43′47″N 27°17′37″E
- Country: Estonia
- County: Võru County
- Parish: Võru Parish
- Time zone: UTC+2 (EET)

Vastseliina (Võro: Vahtsõliina; German: Neuhausen) is a small borough (alevik) in Võru Parish, Võru County in southeastern Estonia. Vastseliina was the center of Vastseliina raion from 1950 to 1959. Vastseliina is the birthplace of wrestler and 1924 Olympic Gold Medalist Eduard Pütsep and writer and lawyer Uido Truija.

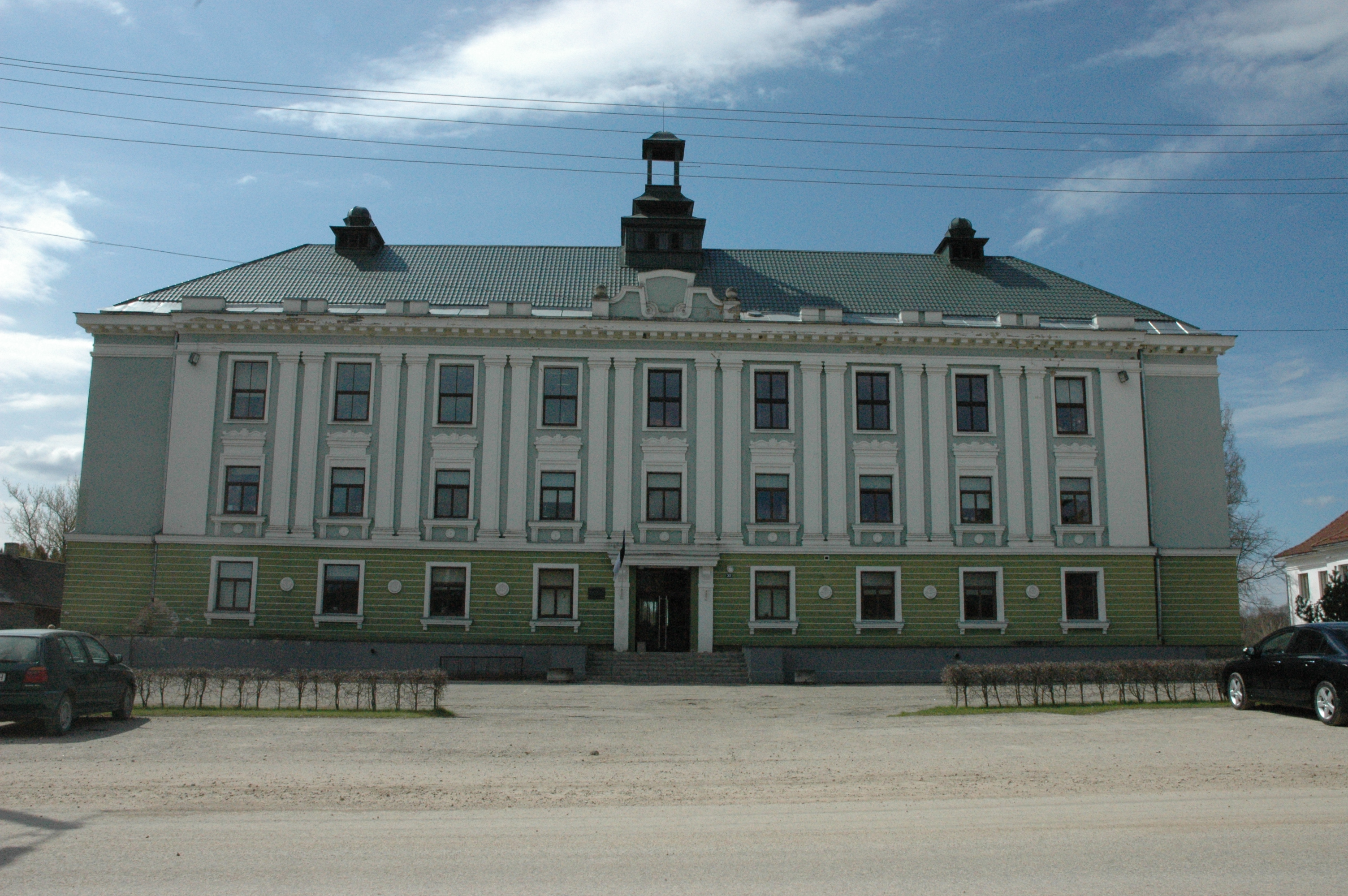

== See also ==
- Vastseliina Castle
