= Yuge National College of Maritime Technology =

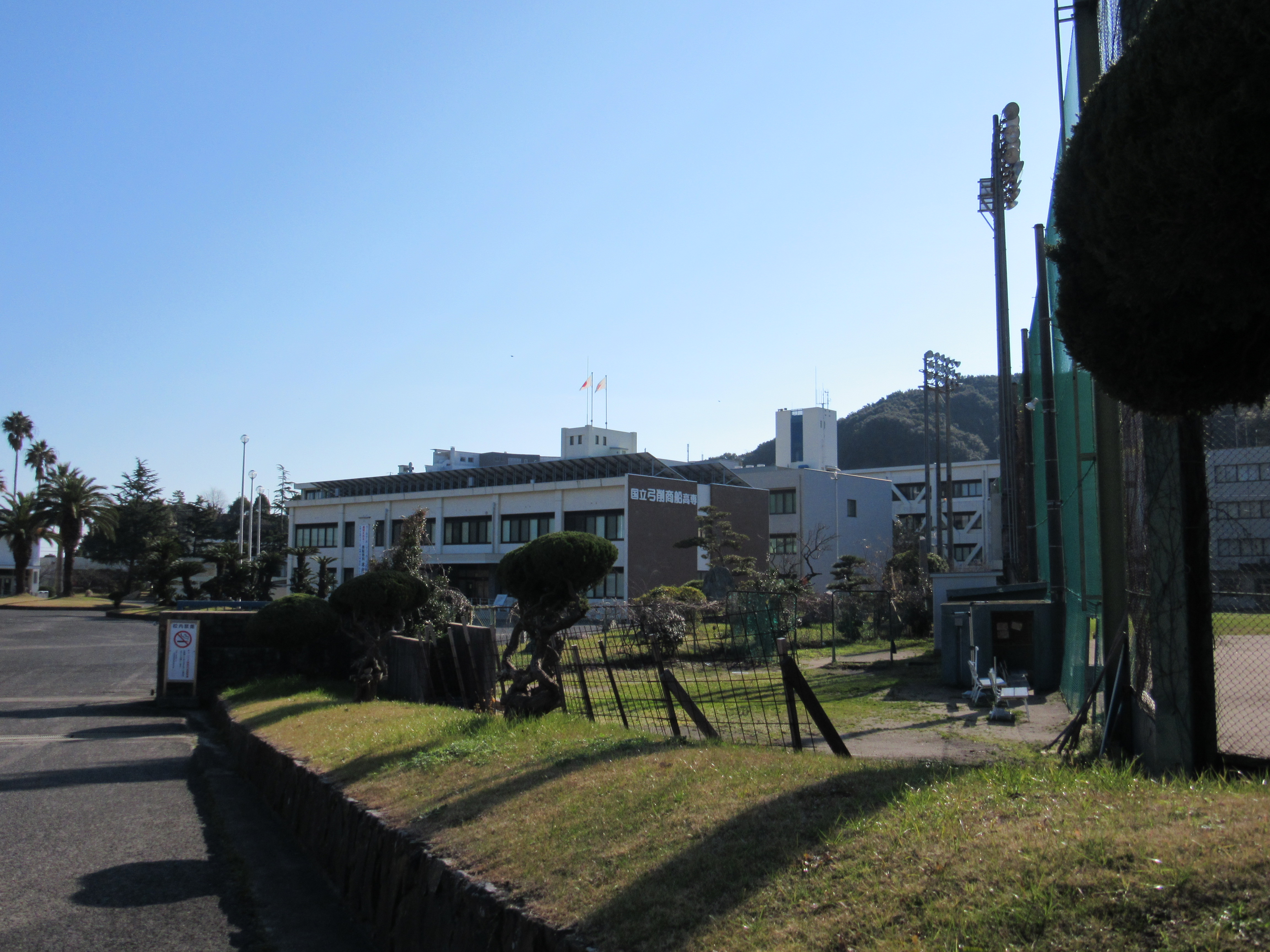
- The Yuge National College of Maritime Technology on January 1, 2016.
- Type: Public
- Established: 1901
- President: -
- Administrative staff: full-time, part-time
- Location: Yuge, Ehime, Japan; 34°15′07.8″N 133°12′26.6″E
- Campus: -
- Website: http://www.yuge-cmt.ac.jp

Yuge National College of Maritime Technology (弓削商船高等専門学校, Yuge Shōsen Kōtō Senmon Gakkō) is one of five national colleges of Maritime Technology in Japan. This college trains deck or engineer licensed mariners.
