= Maritime studies =

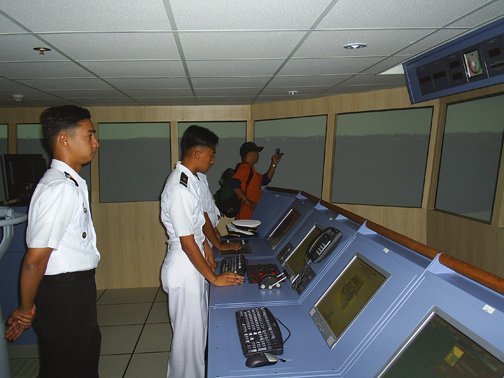
1st class cadets running an oversea bridge simulation as part of maritime studies.

Maritime studies is an interdisciplinary academic field that uses liberal arts or business as the foundation for exploring humankind's relationship with waterways and watersheds. Incorporating maritime history, sea literature, poetry, film, cultural studies, anthropology, archeology, cartography, oceanography, environmental studies, and contemporary marine policy, maritime studies covers a broader scope than traditional maritime history or seamanship.

Maritime Studies "must be broad based and multidisciplinary and involve 'almost every profession having to do with the sea.'" Some of the institutions providing maritime studies combine a broad grounding in technical and scientific coursework with the study of courses in arts and humanities.

While maritime academies frequently prepare cadets for careers in the merchant marine, maritime studies programs prepare students for a variety of careers in the civilian maritime industrial and service sectors. Graduate and undergraduate programs are offered at the following institutions:

- The University of Connecticut /Avery Point Campus
- East Carolina University
- Escola de Formação de Oficiais da Marinha Mercante
- Memorial University of Newfoundland
- Texas A & M Galveston
- University of West Florida
- State University of New York Maritime College
- Norwegian University of Science and Technology
- Maritime University of Szczecin
- Nanyang Technological University
- University of Piraeus
- University of KwaZulu Natal
- HIMT (Hindustan Institute of Maritime Training)

== See also ==
- List of maritime colleges
