= Hiroshima National College of Maritime Technology =

- Type: Public
- Established: 1898
- Administrative staff: full-time, part-time
- Location: Ōsakikamijima, Hiroshima, Japan; 34°15′14.1″N 132°54′15.6″E
- Website: http://www.hiroshima-cmt.ac.jp

Hiroshima National College of Maritime Technology (広島商船高等専門学校, Hiroshima Shōsen Kōtō Senmon Gakkō) is one of five national colleges of maritime technology in Japan. Graduates can earn deck mariner or engineer qualifications.
