= Tallinn Maritime School =

School in Tallinn, Estonia

- Tallinna Merekool
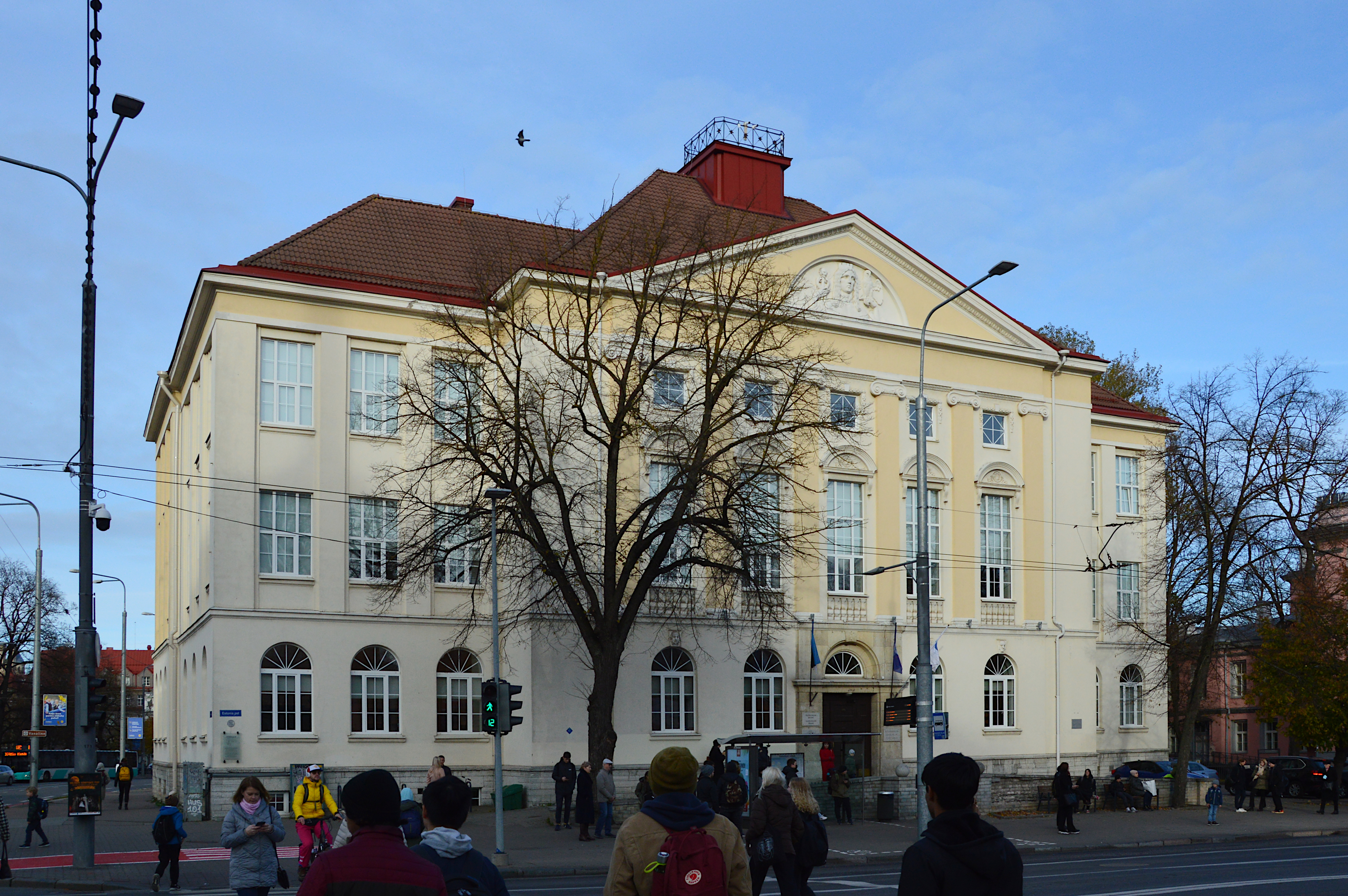
- Former Tallinn Maritime School building where now is Tallinn English College.
- Active: 1919–1991
- Location: Estonia puiestee 10, Tallinn, Estonia
- Language: Estonian and Russian

Tallinn Maritime School (Estonian: Tallinna Merekool) was a former maritime school in Estonia from 1919 to 1991. It was located in Estonia puiestee 10 house where today is Tallinn English College.

== History ==
The first marine school in Estonia was founded in 1715 in Tallinn, later the school was founded in Narva as well. In these so-called calculation-schools, the sailors and shipbuilders studied different subjects, including navigation.

The Tallinn Maritime School, the predecessor of the Estonian Maritime Academy, was founded in 1919. The first location of the school was in Uus-Sadama street 14 building.

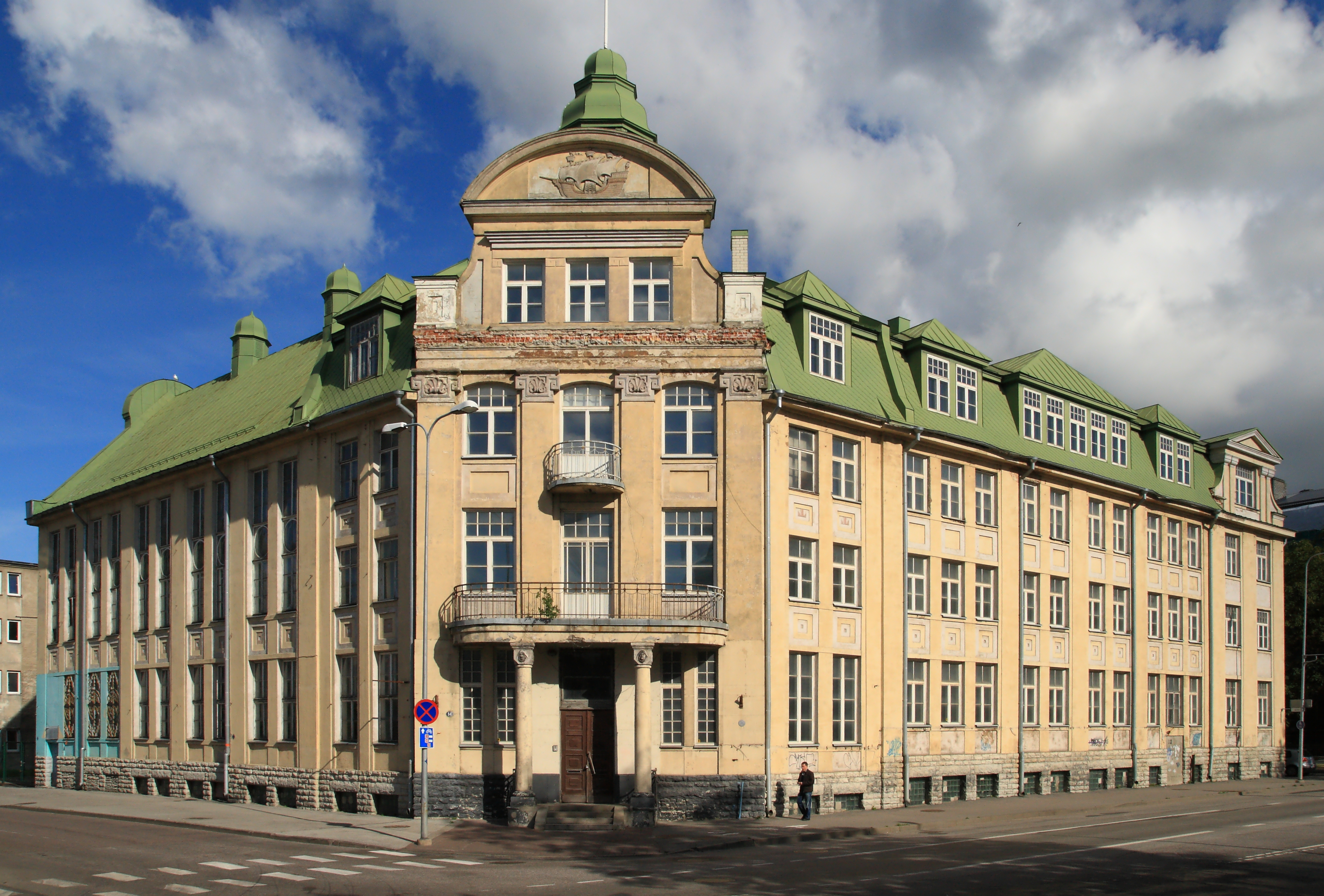
Uus-Sadama street 14 building

After World War II, the school moved to Estonia puiestee 10 building. The school trained merchant fleet sailors, navigators, mechanics and radio operators, later also ship electricians. From 1945 to 1991, the Estonian Maritime Schools belonged to the unified maritime education system of the USSR, and therefore the maritime education of Estonia was predominantly in Russian language.

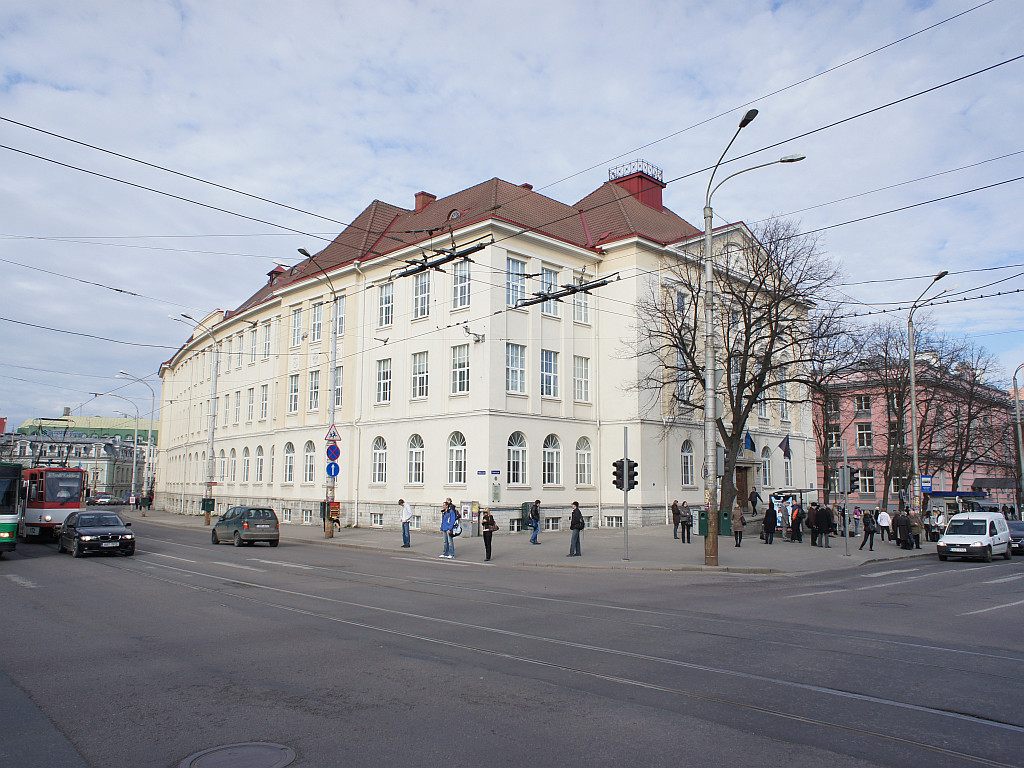
Tallinn Maritime School building from 1944 to 1991

In 1992, three maritime schools: Tallinn Maritime School, Tallinn Marine College and Tallinn 1st Industrial School were united and formed Estonian Maritime Education Center. In 1999, it was renamed as Estonian Maritime Academy.
