= SWU Maritime Regiment =

The Maritime Regiment
- Former names: Southwestern University Maritime College
- Motto: Discipline, Leadership, Honor
- Type: Quasi-Regimental Maritime School
- Established: (1948) 2007
- Chairman: Andrew S. Aznar
- President: Gina S. Aznar
- Dean: Capt. Reynaldo Abella
- Location: Cebu City, Cebu, Philippines
- Campus: Aznar Coliseum
- Colors: Blue, Silver
- Nickname: Seahawks

The Maritime Regiment was a maritime academy of Cebu City, Philippines. Said college is managed by Seacrest Maritime Foundation Inc.(SMFI), a non-profit organization. Known as The Maritime Regiment, it implements a regimental system of training. In 2007, to respond to the current trends of the maritime industry, the Maritime College of Southwestern University was re-established as The Maritime Regiment. In 2008, the college was recognized as a sister school of PMMA (Phil. Merchant Marine Academy) as its program gained recognition.
