= MCL Mapúa-PTC College of Maritime Education and Training =

Private maritime college in Laguna, Philippines

Mapúa-PTC College of Maritime Education and Training
- Motto: Learn. Serve. Lead.
- Type: Private
- Established: 2008
- President: Dr. Reynaldo B. Vea
- Dean: Capt. Armando A. Ternida
- Location: Cabuyao, Laguna, Philippines
- Campus: 6 hectares
- Colors: Blue and Silver
- Website: www.mcl.edu.ph

The Mapúa-PTC College of Maritime Education and Training is a maritime college under Mapúa Malayan Colleges Laguna established in 2008 in the Philippines which trains students in the fields of Marine Engineering and Marine Transportation.

Mapúa Institute of Technology (MIT) is known in the fields of mathematics, science and engineering studies with the Philippine Transmarine Carriers (PTC), a ship manning business and training company. MIT and PTC have joined in the first ever industry and academe cooperation.

Mapúa Malayan Colleges Laguna is the home of the Mapúa–PTC College of Maritime Education and Training.

It was the first college under Mapúa Malayan Colleges Laguna that acquired an International Organization for Standardization (ISO) and Det Norske Veritas (DNV) accreditation.

== History ==
April 10, 2008 marked an event for Malayan Colleges Laguna, a wholly owned subsidiary of Mapua Institute of Technology, and Philippine Transmarine Carriers, Inc., one of the country’s largest crew management companies, as they launched the Mapúa-PTC College of Maritime Education and Training.

At the ceremonial launching, MCL was represented by Dr. Reynaldo B. Vea, president of Malayan Colleges Laguna and Mapua Institute of Technology, and Philippine Transmarine Carriers (PTC) by Mr. Carlos C. Salinas, its chairman and chief executive officer. The ceremony took place at the PTC Office in First Maritime Place, Makati.

The college started to accept candidates in academic year 2008-2009. Many of its students receive scholarships from sponsoring companies.

== Programs offered ==
- Bachelor of Science in Marine Transportation (BS MT)
- Bachelor of Science in Marine Engineering (BS MarE)

== Facilities ==
- Bridge Simulator Facility
- Cargo Handling Simulator Facility
- Engine Room Simulator Facility
- Electronic Chart Display and Information System Facility
- Lab-Volt Technical Training System Facility

== Scholarship ==
Sponsoring companies primarily came from Philippine Transmarine Carriers, Inc., one of the leading provider of Filipino seafarers worldwide.
