= Lal Bahadur Shastri College of Advanced Maritime Studies and Research =

Lal Bahadur Shastri College of Advanced Maritime Studies and Research, Mumbai
- Type: Autonomous research and training institute
- Established: 1948
- Director: Suresh Kumar Nair V.G.
- Faculty: 60
- Undergraduates: 1,200
- Location: Mumbai, Maharashtra, India
- Campus: Sewri, Mumbai Urban; 33 acres (130,000 m^{2})
- Website: www.dgshipping.com/dgship/final/allied_tri1lbs.htm

The Lal Bahadur Shastri College of Advanced Maritime Studies and Research also known as LBS College of Advanced Maritime Studies and Research is a post-sea Maritime Education and Training Institute offering a range of courses for Merchant Navy Officers. The college was established by the Ministry of Transport, Government of India, in 1948.
