= Batumi State Maritime Academy =

University in Batumi, Georgia

Coordinates: 41°38′48.7″N 41°37′18.6″E

- სსიპ — სასწავლო უნივერსიტეტი — ბათუმის სახელმწიფო საზღვაო აკადემია
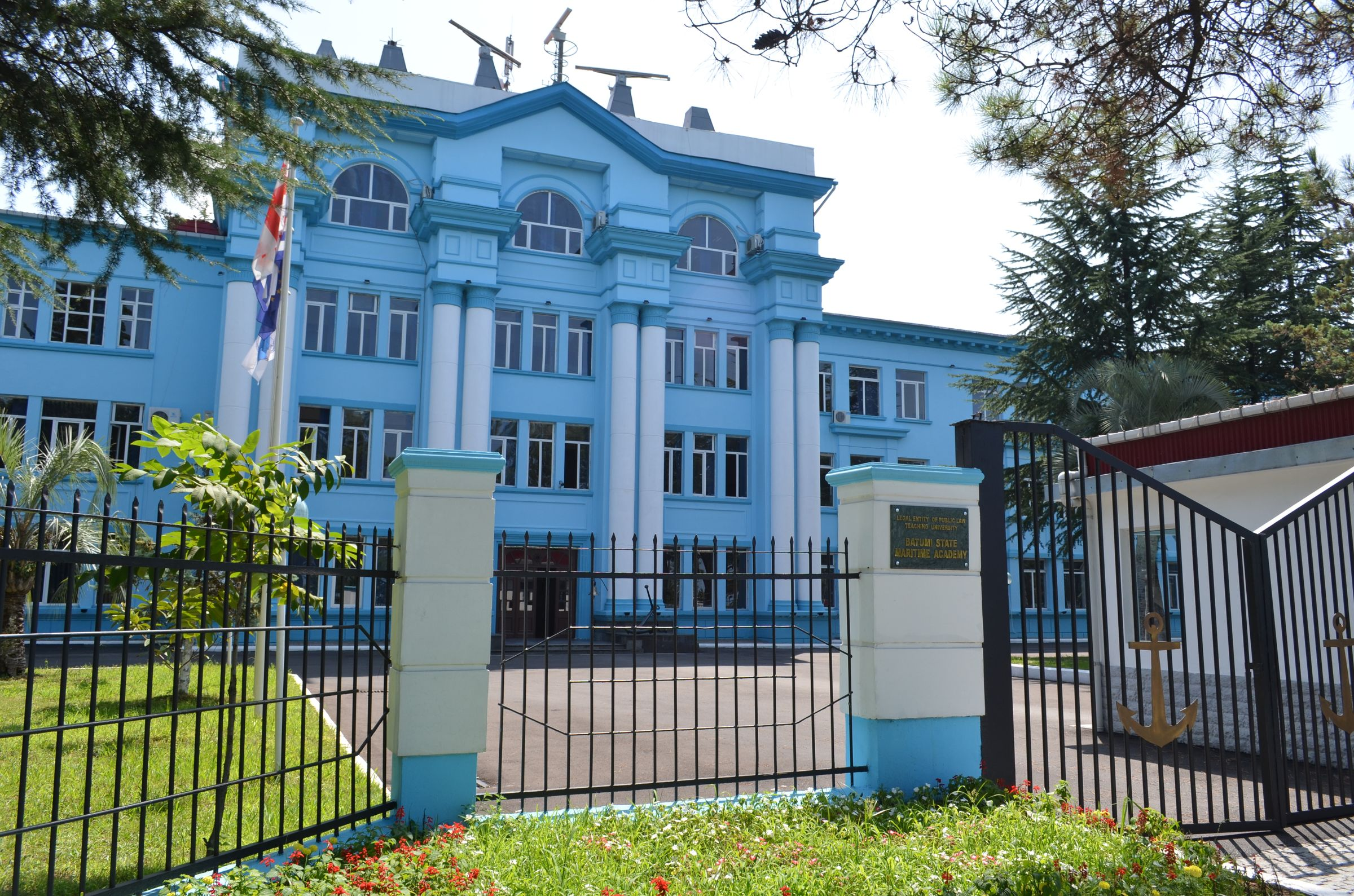
- The main entrance to the Academy.
- Other names: აკადემია (ak'ademia, "academy")
- Type: Public
- Established: 1929; 97 years ago
- Endowment: Fully self-financed since 2015
- Rector: Murtaz Devadze
- Academic staff: 41 (maritime faculty); 37 (training centre) ? (business and management faculty)
- Students: 2500
- Other students: 200 (1-year program trainees)
- Location: Batumi, Georgia
- Campus: Urban
- Language: Georgian
- Colours: Black and white
- Mascot: Anchor
- Website: bsma.edu.ge

Batumi State Maritime Academy (BSMA, Georgian: ბათუმის სახელმწიფო საზღვაო აკადემია) is an internationally accredited higher-education maritime school in Batumi, Georgia. The institution's main function is to prepare qualified staff for employment within the marine-trade fleet and maritime transport infrastructure. Batumi State Maritime Academy provides an educational process that is in accordance with Georgian legislation as well as the international STCW Convention.

== History ==
Batumi Maritime Technical University was inaugurated in 1929. On March 5, 1944, the self-defense committee of the Soviet Union created the Batumi Maritime Institute. The institute played an important role in the development of maritime activities in the Soviet Union as a whole. The institute has taught up to 5,000 highly qualified maritime specialists; their graduates continue to work on ocean ships across the world.

The academy was created by the Georgian government in 1992, shortly after gaining independence following the dissolution of the USSR. Following the nationwide reform of the education system in 2004, BSMA received legal status as a teaching university on April 25, 2005.

One of the most notable persons to have studied in the academy was Anatoli Kacharava. Briefly after World War II he began teaching there as a full-time lecturer. After his death in 1982, he was honourably buried on the grounds of the academy.

== Education ==
The academy offers education in many fields within the maritime industry. Maritime graduates occupy leadership positions on crews of maritime trade ships, maritime crewing companies and other public and private maritime services, whose activities are related to maritime transport, control and management. BSMA promotes the development of maritime institutions in the Black Sea region. Its proximity to Batumi, Poti and Kulevi ports and Supsa customs create excellent conditions for students to work with qualified staff.

Maritime transportation and related services or activities are regulated by national legislation and by international regulations, such as the International Maritime Organization (IMO). The basic legislative document of IMO is the STCW Convention. Georgia joined the convention in 1993, giving BSMA the responsibility of preparing qualified staff for international maritime trading and shipping industries.

The core of the education system of the college is its maritime engineering faculty. However, the second largest faculty, called Business and Management, also enjoys popularity within high-school seniors willing to receive education within this field.

The academy frequently receives international delegations from Poland, Norway, Ireland, Turkey, and others, some of which are within the European Erasmus+ programme while others establish student exchange programs, mutual training and general partnership agreements. A maritime student training centre was opened in 2014 with the help of the local and central governments of Georgia, which cost 2 million Georgian Lari. The training centre, acting under IMO regulations, operates a professional sailing simulator for the maritime faculty students, as well as safety and firefighting equipment necessary for certification under the guidelines of the STCW Convention.

A typical day in the academy begins with the semi-military style line-up of students in the morning (for the maritime faculty), during which the names of the present students are recorded. After the traditional ceremony of raising the Georgian flag as well as the flag of the academy, while the Georgian national anthem is played by the university orchestra, students proceed to their classes. Students are required to wear the academy uniforms, which are provided to them on the first semester of the first year. All freshmen are also required to undergo a certain number of watchkeeping exercises on the territory of the academy.

== Academic programs ==
Education programs are implemented by two certification programs and three bachelors programs.

=== Maritime faculty ===
==== Bachelors ====
- Maritime navigation
- Marine engineering
- Marine electromechanics

==== Masters ====
- Marine Transport Management
- Ship's Power Plants and Mechanisms
- Ship's and Sea Ports Electric and Power Plants

=== Business and Management faculty ===
==== Bachelors ====
- Organization and Logistics of Maritime Transportation
- Port Management
- Tourism - Cruise Tourism Management

==== Masters ====
- Logistics and Expediting
- International Business Management
- Banking
